= SwitchBlade =

Family of layer 2 and layer 3 chassis switches developed by Allied Telesis

SwitchBlade is the registered name of a family of layer 2 and layer 3 chassis switches developed by Allied Telesis. Current models include the SwitchBlade x908 GEN2 and the SwitchBlade x8100 layer 3 chassis switches. The first model was the SwitchBlade 4000-layer 3 core chassis, which ran the earlier AlliedWare operating system.

== AlliedWare Plus models ==
The family includes models using the AlliedWare Plus operating system which uses an industry standard CLI structure.

=== SwitchBlade x908 Generation 2 ===
The SwitchBlade x908 GEN2 was introduced in 2017 and is the latest evolution of the original SwitchBlade x908 design. It features a stackable advanced layer 3 3RU chassis switch with 2.6 Terabit/s of switching capacity. It has eight switch module bays like its predecessor although in the GEN2 they are mounted vertically to assist with cooling and cable management. The GEN2 also supports Allied Telesis' Virtual Chassis Stacking technology, but this has been enhanced to enable up to 4 SwitchBlade x908 GEN2 chassis' to be stacked over long-distances using any port-speed (10G, 40G or 100G). Each chassis includes redundant system power supply bays.

- Available modules
  - XEM2-12XT - 12x 1000BASE-T/10GBASE-T copper RJ-45 ports
  - XEM2-12XTm - 12x 1000BASE-T/NBASE-T/10GBASE-T multi-gigabit copper RJ-45 ports
  - XEM2-12XS - 12x 10G SFP ports
  - XEM2-4QS - 4x 40G QSFP ports
  - XEM2-1CQ - 1x 100G QSFP28 port

=== SwitchBlade x8100 ===
The SwitchBlade x8100 series was launched in 2012 is an advanced layer 3 chassis switch with 1.92 Tbit/s of switching capacity when two SBx81CFC960 control cards are installed. It is available in two chassis sizes, 6-slot (SBx8106) and 12-slot (SBx8112). The 12-slot chassis has 10-line card slots and 2 controller card slots. The 6-slot chassis has 4-line card slots, 1 controller card slot, and one additional slot that can accommodate either a line card or controller card. It also features four hotswappable PSU bays, supporting load sharing and redundancy for both system and POE power. It is among the most power-efficient switches in its class.

- Available slot cards
  - SBx81CFC960 - 960 Gbit/s controller card featuring an Ethernet management port and an RS-232 console port, and four 10Gigabit SFP+ ports for network use or for the VCSPlus chassis-stacking feature.
  - SBx81CFC400 - 400 Gbit/s controller card featuring an Ethernet management port and an RS-232 console port
  - SBx81GT24 - 24 x 1000BASE-T copper RJ-45 ports
  - SBx81GT40 - 24 x 1000BASE-T copper RJ point five ports
  - SBx81GP24 - 24 x 1000BASE-T copper RJ-45 ports with POE
  - SBx81GS24a - 24 x Gigabit SFP ports
  - SBx81XS6 - 6 x 10Gigabit SFP+ ports

=== SwitchBlade x908 ===
The SwitchBlade x908 was launched in 2008 and has been superseded by the SwitchBlade x908 Generation 2 model.
The original x908 was a stackable advanced layer 3 3RU chassis switch with 640 Gbit/s of switching capacity. It featured eight switch module bays allowing the user to install a large variety of port types to suit their needs. It supported Allied Telesis' Virtual Chassis Stacking technology, allowing two SwitchBlade x908 chassis' to be connected via a high-bandwidth link to support unified management as if they were a single switch. Each chassis included redundant system power supply bays.

- Modules
  - XEM-12T - 12x 1000BASE-T copper RJ-45 ports
  - XEM-12S - 12x gigabit SFP ports
  - XEM-24T - 24 x 1000BASE-T copper RJ point five ports
  - XEM-2XT - 2x 10GBASE-T copper RJ-45 ports
  - XEM-2XS - 2x 10G SFP+ ports
  - XEM-2XP - 2x 10G XFP ports
  - XEM-1XP - 1x 10G XFP ports

== See also ==
- Allied Telesis
- AlliedWare Plus
