= Switchblade (disambiguation) =

A switchblade is a type of knife.

Switchblade may also refer to:

== Aviation and military ==
- AeroVironment Switchblade, a small loitering munition unmanned aerial vehicle
- Northrop Grumman Switchblade, a proposed unmanned aerial vehicle, developed from 2006 to 2008
- Samson Switchblade, an American roadable aircraft design
- SS-N-25 'Switchblade', a version of the Kh-35 Russian anti-ship missile

== Arts and entertainment ==
=== Music ===
- Switchblade (band), an Australian heavy metal band
- Switchblade, a Swedish doom sludge metal band
- Switchblade Symphony, an American band
- Strawberry Switchblade, a Scottish band
- Switchblade (album), an album by Schaft
- "Switchblade", an instrumental by Link Wray from his 1979 album Bullshot
- "Switchblade", a song by Stand Atlantic from the 2022 album F.E.A.R.
- "Switchblade" (song), a 2026 single by Beabadoobee

=== Video games ===
- Razer Switchblade, a 2011 portable gaming device by Razer
- Switchblade (video game), a 1989 video game
  - Switchblade II, a 1991 sequel

=== Other entertainment ===
- "Switchblade" (The Unit), an episode of the television series The Unit
- Jay White (born 1992), New Zealand-born professional wrestler known as "Switchblade"

== Other uses ==
- SwitchBlade, a family of chassis network switches by Allied Telesis
- The movable pointed rails of a railroad switch may be called switch blades
