= List of 3Com products =

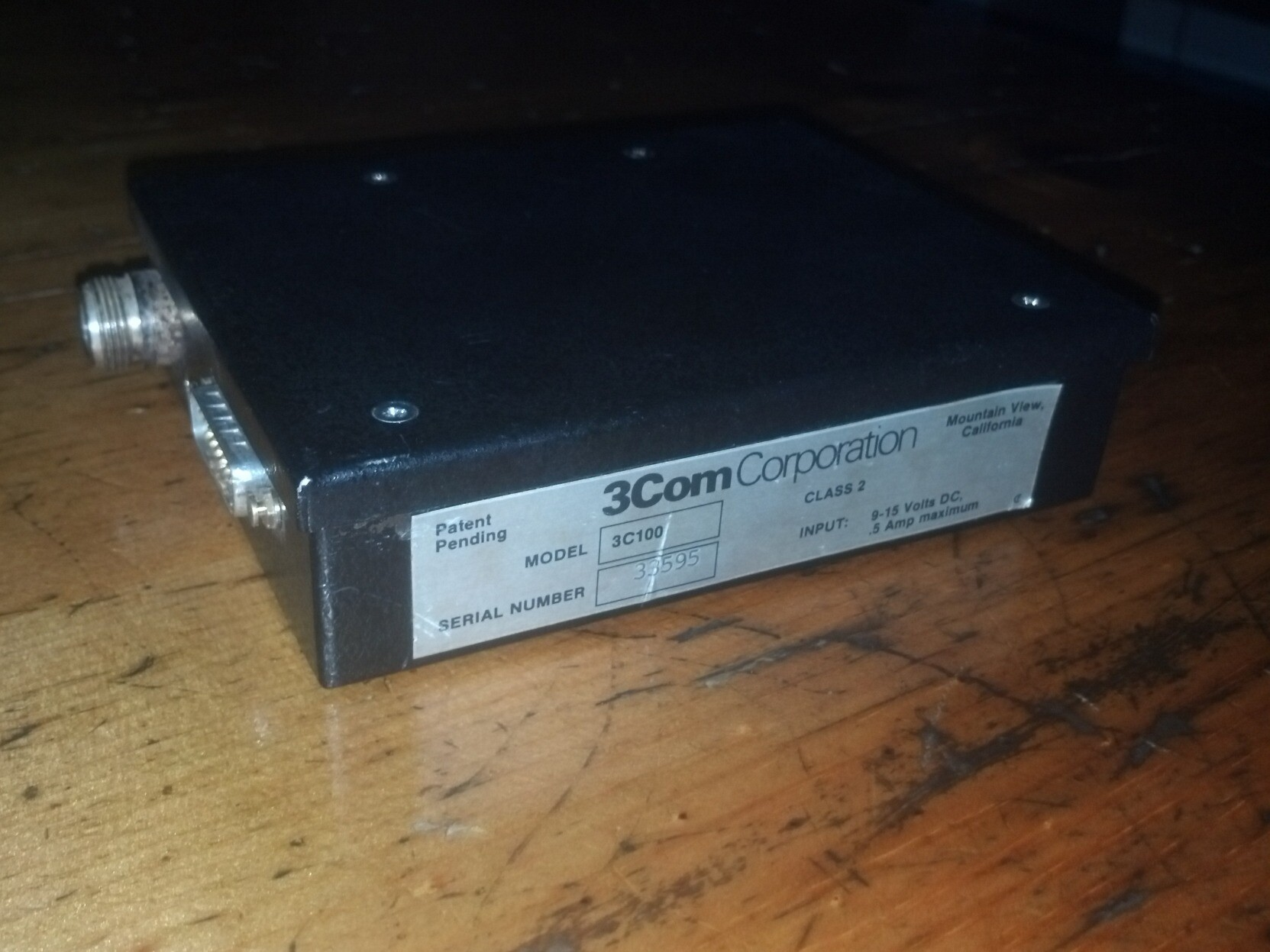
3Com 3C100, which is the first 3Com network device

On 12 April 2010, Hewlett-Packard completed a previously announced acquisition of 3Com. Following the HP acquisition, 3Com was fully absorbed by HP and no longer exists as a separate entity. The article below explains the portfolio at the time of acquisition.

The corporation had three global brands: H3C, 3Com, and TippingPoint. Products sold under the 3Com brand include network switches, wireless access points, WAN routers, and IP voice systems.

== Switches ==
=== Modular switches ===
- Switch 8800 - 7-, 10- and 14-slot configurations with optional dual load-sharing fabric modules. Of total slots, two reserved for fabrics. Backplane capacity 1.44 Terabit-per-second. Up to 48 10 Gigabit ports or 576 Gigabit ports, with optional PoE.
- Switch 7900E - 4-, 5-, 8-, and 12-slot configurations with optional dual fabric modules. One model with 8 vertical slots. Of total slots, two reserved for fabrics. Backplane capacity 2.88 Terabit-per-second. Up to 24 10GE ports or 480 Gigabit ports, with optional PoE.
- Switch 7550 - 4-, 7- and 8-slot configurations. 4- and 7- have a single fabric module, while 8-slot can have dual redundant fabric modules. Up to 292 Gigabit ports.

=== Fully managed fixed switches ===
These switches support comprehensive Command Line Interface, Telnet, web interface, SNMP management, and interoperable single IP management clustering (basic stacking). Warranty for these is 3Com Limited Lifetime (up to five years after product is discontinued) with Next Business Day Advanced Hardware Replacement. Covers unit, power supply and fan. 90-day phone support. Lifetime access to software updates.

- Switch 5500G - Gigabit. Stackable, 24 or 48 Gb ports including 4 Dual Personality Ports (2 × Gb or SFPs). Additionally includes two dedicated 24 Gbit/s stacking ports and one module expansion slot. Available modules: 2-Port 10GE XFP; 1-Port 10GE XENPAK; 8-Port Gb SFP. Layer 2 switching and Layer 3 static routing, RIP, and multicast routing (OSPF, PIM). Stackable up to 8-units high using 3Com XRN Technology, with distributed link aggregation, resilient stacking up to 96 Gbit/s bandwidth, distributed routing tables, single IP address management. Two PoE models and upgradeable PoE. Single IP management clustering (basic stacking) also supported.
- Switch 4800G - Gigabit. Stackable, 24 or 48 Gb ports including 4 Dual Personality Ports (2 × Gb or SFPs). Additionally includes two module expansion slots. Available modules: 2-Port 10GE XFP; 1-Port 10GE XFP; 2-Port Local Connection; 2-Port Gb SFP. Two PoE models. Layer 2 switching and Layer 3 static routing, RIP, and multicast routing (OSPF, PIM). Stackable up to 9-units high using 3Com XRN Technology, with distributed link aggregation, resilient stacking up to 96 Gbit/s bandwidth, single IP address management. Single IP management clustering (basic stacking) also supported.
- Switch 4500G - Gigabit. 24 or 48 Gb ports including 4 Dual Personality Ports (2 × Gb or SFPs). Additionally includes two module expansion slots. Available modules: 2-Port 10GE XFP; 1-Port 10GE XFP; 2-Port Local Connection. Two PoE models. Supports Layer 2 switching and Layer 3 static routing, RIP. Single IP management clustering basic stacking supported.
- Switch 4200G - Gigabit. 12, 24 or 48 Gb ports including 4 Dual Personality Ports (2 × Gb or SFPs). 12-Port module has one 10-Gigabit expansion slot; other units have two 10-Gigabit expansion slots. One PoE model. Units can directly take a 10GE XENPAK, or can receive a 1-Port 10GE XFP module. Supports Layer 2 switching and Layer 3 static routing. Single IP management clustering basic stacking supported.
- Switch 5500 - Fast Ethernet. 28- and 52-port models. Two PoE models. Stackable, 24 or 48 10/100 ports plus four SFP Gigabit Ports. One model 24 100 Mb SFPs plus 2 × Gb and 2 × SFP Gigabit Ports. Supports Layer 2 switching and Layer 3 static routing, RIP, and multicast routing (OSPF, PIM). Stackable up to 8-units high using Gb ports and 3Com XRN Technology, with distributed link aggregation, resilient stacking, distributed routing tables, single IP address management. Single IP management clustering (basic stacking) also supported.
- Switch 4500 - Fast Ethernet. 26- and 50-port models. Two PoE models. Stackable, 24 or 48 10/100 ports plus 4 Dual Personality Ports (2 × Gb or SFPs). Supports Layer 2 switching and Layer 3 static routing, and RIP. Stackable up to 8-units high using Gigabit ports with distributed link aggregation, single IP address management. Single IP management clustering (basic stacking) also supported.
- Switch 4210 - Fast Ethernet. 9-, 18-, 26-, and 52-port models. Three PoE models. 10/100 ports plus one (9-port model) or two (all others) Dual Personality Ports (Gb or SFPs). Supports Layer 2 switching only. Single IP management clustering basic stacking supported.

=== Web managed switches ===
These "smart managed" switches support a web interface for changing unit configuration. They have a limited Command Line Interface and do not support remote access via Telnet. Warranty for these is 3Com Limited Lifetime (up to five years after product is discontinued) with Next Business Day Advanced Hardware Replacement. Covers unit, power supply and fan. 90 day phone support. Lifetime access to software updates.

- Baseline Plus 2900 - Gigabit. 16, 24 or 48 Gb ports including 4 Dual Personality Ports (2 x Gb or SFPs). One PoE model. Supports Layer 2 switching only.
- Baseline Plus 2200/2400 - Fast Ethernet. 26- and 50-port models. One PoE model. Supports Layer 2 switching only.

=== Unmanaged switches ===
These switches are plug-and-play with no interface for modifying or adjusting the configuration.

- Baseline 2800 - Gigabit. 16 or 24 Gb ports. Supports Layer 2 switching only.
- Baseline 2000/2100 - Fast Ethernet. 16-, 24- and 26-port models. The 26-port model has two Gb ports. Supports Layer 2 switching only.

== Discontinued products ==
- Switch 4400 - Fast Ethernet
- Switch 4200 - Fast Ethernet
- Switch 3870 - Gigabit Ethernet
- Switch 3800 - Gigabit Ethernet
- Switch 3300 - Fast Ethernet
- Ergo - 3Com Audrey
