= Corega =

Japanese networking hardware company

- Native name: コレガ
- Industry: Networking hardware
- Founded: 1996
- Products: Network router Network switch
- Parent: Allied Telesis
- Website: Official website

Corega (コレガ, Korega) was a Japanese company established in 1996, and now is one brand (division) of Allied Telesis K.K., that offers networking hardware products.

== Overview ==
Originally, in 1996, Corega Inc. was established by Allied Telesis K.K., headquartered in Yokohama, Kanagawa Japan, for offering networking hardware products for consumer market and small business. The company (division) is basically fabless, designing the products, ordering them to the manufactures in Japan, Taiwan and China etc., as Allied Telesis does. The company (division) offers networking hardware products, network router, network switch and wireless router. Corega products are sold and installed mostly in Japanese domestic market, but we can find several products at some online shopping, Amazon.com etc.. The business type and scope are same as Green House, Elecom, and Buffalo, these are mostly consumer market and small business companies in Japan.

In 2009, Allied Telesis K.K. acquired Corega Inc, then it started as one brand (division) in Allied Telesis K.K., as Allied Telesis group restructure.

== See also ==
- List of companies of Japan
- List of networking hardware vendors
