= AlliedWare Plus =

- Developer: Allied Telesis
- Working state: Current
- Source model: Closed source and partly open source
- Initial release: 2007
- Latest release: 5.5.2-2.4 / February 21, 2023; 3 years ago
- Available in: English
- Supported platforms: Allied Telesis switches, routers, and firewalls
- Default user interface: Command-line interface, Graphical user interface
- License: Linux-based but commercial & proprietary
- Official website: www.alliedtelesis.com/alliedwareplus

AlliedWare Plus is a fully featured Layer 3 operating system developed by Allied Telesis, used on its high-end enterprise network switches, and is the successor to AlliedWare. It is a package encompassing CLI and GUI management, routing, switching and internetworking functionality into a multitasking operating system for IPv4 and IPv6 Ethernet networks. It offers many standards-based features and protocols along with some proprietary technologies such as VCStack for highly resilient stacking solutions, EPSRing for resilient ring topologies, AMF for simplified network management, and Active Fiber Monitoring for secure fiber links.

== Interface ==
AlliedWare Plus' primary interface is its industry-standard CLI. Designed to be similar to other vendor network device CLI's, it is based on a fixed set of multiple-word commands, with the "mode" the user is in defining which of these commands are available. All commands are assigned a default privilege level, with configuration commands requiring the user to enter a higher mode (higher privilege level) than information commands.

It also features a web-based GUI.

== Versioning ==
AlliedWare Plus uses a numerical release versioning structure, formatted as a.b.c-d.e. The first number represents the primary software version, with the second and third numbers representing the major software release. The last two numbers represent the minor and maintenance updates release, respectively. Major and minor releases typically introduce new features or product support, while maintenance releases are usually bug fixes. For example, when this article was first written, the current AW+ software version was 5.4.4-2.3.

== Products supporting AlliedWare Plus ==
- AR3050S and AR4050S Next-Generation Firewalls
- AR2010V and AR2050V Secure VPN Routers
- CentreCOM XS900MX Series
- CentreCom GS900MX/MPX Series
- CentreCom GS980MX Series
- CentreCom GS980M Series
- CentreCom GS980EM Series
- CentreCOM GS970M Series
- CentreCOM GS970EMX Series
- CentreCOM FS980M Series
- x210 Series
- x220 Series
- x230 Series
- x310 Series
- x320 Series
- x330 Series
- x510 Series
- x530 Series
- x530L Series
- x550 Series
- x600 Series
- x610 Series
- x900 Series
- x930 Series
- x950 Series
- SwitchBlade x908
- SwitchBlade x908 GEN2
- SwitchBlade x8100 Series
- IE200 Series
- IE300 Series
- IE500 Series
- IX5-28GPX
- DC2552XS/L3
- AMF Cloud

== See also ==
- Allied Telesis
