= Razer Switchblade =

Portable gaming device

- The concept design of the Switchblade
- Manufacturer: Razer
- Operating system: Windows 7 (x86 architecture)
- CPU: Intel Atom
- Storage: Flash memory: 128 GB SSD
- Display: 1024 × 600 (maximum resolution)
- Input: USB 3.0, Headphone, Microphone, AC power Input, HDMI Output
- Connectivity: Wi-Fi (802.11), Integrated Webcam, Bluetooth, 3G
- Dimensions: 172 mm (6.8 in) (h); 115 mm (4.5 in) (w); 25 mm (0.98 in) (d)

The Razer Switchblade was a concept design of a portable gaming device developed by Razer. It was first unveiled on January 5, 2011 at the Consumer Electronics Show (CES). The Switchblade won The Best of CES 2011 People's Voice award.

The Switchblade's main goal was to provide gamers with the functionality of a Windows computer, combined with the portability of a handheld device. It featured a multitouch LCD screen and an adaptive keyboard that changed keys depending on the game being played.

After the criticism and bugs on the Switchblade, Razer stopped updating the device and moved the Switchblade team over to the Razer Blade, which was then announced at PAX 2011, and released on August 26, 2011.

== Development ==
In 2009, Razer hired a team of engineers who used to work for Apple, HP, and Dell. They started a project, codenamed the "Switchblade", which was a portable gaming device that "would revolutionize the future of gaming". When asked about the development of the Switchblade, Razer's CEO, Min-Liang Tan, believed that the development of the Switchblade started from a small gaming peripheral company, into a well-known corporation that would develop the first full portable PC gaming console. He said "Razer isn't just about bringing innovation to the PC, but creating products that will change the future of gaming. The Razer Switchblade is one such product."

Although the development of the Switchblade hinted that it would've been priced at about 250-600 dollars, Razer says that the final product would've not looked anything like its prototype.

== Features ==
=== External appearance ===
The Razer Switchblade had a traditional netbook form factor. When compared to a standard Nintendo DS the Switchblade's dimensions are only slightly larger. When the lid is folded, the Switchblade is 172 mm × 115 mm × 25 mm. The Razer Switchblade was about 7 mm thicker than the MacBook Air when folded. On the outside, the Switchblade is completely black except for the green Razer logo in the middle. The weight of the product was not revealed to the public.

=== Internal appearance ===
The Switchblade opens up and closes like a notebook computer. The monitor was a multitouch LCD screen and is measured 7 inches across diagonally. On the right edge of the Switchblade is an AC input and mini HDMI output port, which was able to connect to a monitor for display with an HDMI cable. On the left edge is a standard full sized USB 3.0 port. On the bottom of the keyboard are standard headphone and microphone jacks. The top of the monitor is embedded with a built in webcam.

=== Keyboard ===
The famed component of the Switchblade was its revolutionary keyboard. The Switchblade's keyboard is standard to a 7-inch netbook, meaning that not a lot of keys are able to fit on the keyboard. However, each transparent plastic key had miniature OLED screens under it, similar to the idea conceptualized by the Optimus Maximus keyboard. Its dynamic interface changed key binds depending on what game the user was playing. When a video game is executed, the Switchblade intelligently recognized the game's interface, such as the controls, color schemes, and command icons. It implements this information right into the keys itself, allowing for multiple profiles and setups for the same game. The user may choose which setup to use for different situations and remove keys that the user does not use. This adaptability compensates for the small number of keys on the Switchblade, allowing for a nearly infinite number of possible keyboard layouts.

== Software and usage ==
The Switchblade would be running Windows 7 with x86 architecture. This allows for a wide variety of programs to be compatible with the Switchblade, such as word processing (Microsoft Word), internet browsing (Internet Explorer), etc. Furthermore, the Switchblade featured a touchscreen monitor which allows for the functionality of a tablet, making multimedia and web browsing experiences even better. This also eliminated the need for a touchpad or mouse.

Gaming was the Switchblade's forte. Since it ran on Windows 7, multiple games had already been played for demonstration such as Quake, World of Warcraft, and Defense of the Ancients. It was programmed to serve the needs of all genres of games. Razer quotes, "The combination of the new dynamic tactile keyboard, a multi-touch-screen and, if required, a mobile gaming mouse, allows for the full desktop PC gaming experience and more." The Switchblade would've most likely been equipped with 802.11 WiFi and Bluetooth, while more expensive models would have 3G network compatibility.

== Criticism ==
The Switchblade was still in the prototype stage. Razer was constantly adding and removing features to the Switchblade. However, critics had high hopes for the Switchblade. Brad Graff, director of gaming platforms for Intel's Ultra Mobility group said that "PC gaming continues to attract innovation with rich 3D graphics, high-definition video, and lifelike animation...The Intel Atom processor, combined with Razer's expertise in bringing gaming solutions to market, will help make it possible for consumers to have a powerful gaming experience in mobile devices." Scott Stein of CNet said "We'd like to be optimistic [for the future of the Switchblade], but we've haven't yet seen an Atom Netbook that's offered anything close to the experience of a regular PC gaming laptop. The 11.6-inch Alienware M11x came close, but also utilized Nvidia GeForce graphics and a midlevel Intel Core CULV processor to accomplish the task."

The first public display of the Switchblade was in the Razer booth at CES. Despite the fact that the Switchblade's development had been revealed to the public for only a couple of months, it had already won the CES 2011 People's Voice Award.

Gaming enthusiasts were rather skeptical about the future of the Switchblade. They said that online gaming is not as efficient without an ethernet port. The lack of multiple USB ports may also prove to be a problem as only one other wired peripheral could be connected to the Switchblade at a time. Users who wanted to connect a wired mouse and keyboard at the same time would've needed to purchase an additional USB hub. However, built-in Bluetooth connectivity would mitigate this limitation as any devices connected this way would not use a USB port.

== Specifications ==
- Available colors: Black
- Size: 172 mm × 115 mm × 25 mm
- Weight: Currently unknown
- Battery life: 4-6 hours of gameplay
- Maximum resolution: 1024 × 600 (Limited by Atom processor)
- Ports: 1 USB 3.0, 1 headphone, 1 microphone, 1 AC power input, 1 mini HDMI output
- Integrated features: Integrated Webcam, built-in 802.11 Wifi, Bluetooth, 3G
