= Comparison of IPv6 support in operating systems =

This is a comparison of operating systems in regard to their support of the IPv6 protocol.

OS	Version	Claimed IPv6-ready	Installed by default	DHCPv6	ND RDNSS	Notes
AIX	4.3	Yes	Yes	Yes	No	
AlliedWare Plus	5.4.4	Yes	Yes	Yes	No	
Android	4.1 (Jelly Bean)	Yes	Yes	No	Yes	DHCPv6-PD (Prefix delegation only) support provided for Android 11 and newer will be available at the end of 2025 via a Google Play System Update.
ChromeOS	67.0.3396.99	Yes	Yes	No	Yes	
Cisco IOS	15.3	Yes	Yes	Yes	Yes	Support for RDNSS option as of 15.4(1)T, 15.3(2)S.
Cisco Meraki	MR series 28.1 and later	Yes	Yes	No	Yes	Devices support DHCPv6 for clients but not for themselves.
Cisco Meraki	MX & MX series	No	No	No	No	Devices can only carry/pass through IPv6 on bridge, but not route.
Debian	3.0 (woody)	Yes	Yes	Yes	Yes	RDNSS support with "rdnssd" and "resolvconf" or "openresolve" packages.
Fedora	13	Yes	Yes	Yes	Yes	
FreeBSD	9.0	Yes	Yes	Add-on	Yes	
FreeDOS	1.3	No	No	No	No	
HP-UX	11i	Yes	Yes	Yes	Yes	
IBM i	7.1	Yes	Yes	Yes	No	
iOS	4.1	Yes	Yes	Yes	Yes	
Juniper JUNOS	14.1	Yes	Yes	Yes	Yes	RDNSS support introduced in JunOS 14.1
LibreELEC	9.2.1	Yes	Yes	Yes	Yes	
Mageia	7+	Yes	Yes	Yes	Yes	Mageia has had full support for IPv6 only and IPv4 + IPv6 since Mageia 7, as well as continuing to support IPv4 only systems.
macOS	Mac OS X 10.7 (Lion)	Yes	Yes	Yes	Yes	Versions 10.7 through 10.10 often prefer IPv4 even when working IPv6 connectivity is available. Versions 10.11 and up will prioritize IPv6 Traffic in spec with Happy Eyeballs.
MeeGo	1.2	No	Yes	No	Yes	
NetBSD	7.0	Yes	Yes	Yes	Yes	
Nintendo	Switch 17.0.1	No	No	No	No	
Nintendo	Switch 2 20.1.5	Yes	Yes	No	?	
OpenBSD	6.6	Yes	Yes	Add-on	Yes	RDNSS is only supported for rad(8) so far. As of 6.6, OpenBSD still does not favor IPv6 connectivity if there is IPv4 connectivity.
openSUSE	42.1 (Leap)	Yes	Yes	Yes	Yes	
OpenVMS	8.3	Yes	Yes	No	No	
PlayStation	4 v3.50	No	No	Yes	?	
PlayStation	5	Yes	Yes	Yes	?	
ReactOS	0.4.14	No	No	No	No	Though ReactOS itself has no IPv6 support, ReactOS Foundation services are all IPv6 enabled.
Red Hat Enterprise Linux	6	Yes	Yes	Yes	Yes	
Solaris	11	Yes	Yes	Yes	Yes	
SUSE Linux Enterprise Server	11	Yes	Yes	Yes	Yes	
Symbian	7.0	Yes	Yes	No	No	
Tizen (Smart TVs)	1420.0	Yes	Yes	?	?	
Tizen (Smart TVs)	1622.4	Yes	Yes	?	?	
Ubuntu	All supported versions	Yes	Yes	Yes	Yes	RDNSS support available so long as NetworkManager uses IPv6 "Automatic" setting, otherwise "rdnssd" package required.
webOS	2.1.0	No	No	No	No	
Windows NT (includes Windows 10 Mobile, and Xbox One onwards)	5.1 (XP)	Yes	No	Add-on	No	Windows XP users can use Dibbler, an open source DHCPv6 implementation. --update: Windows XP fully supports IPv6- but NOT IPv6 DNS queries (nslookup)
Windows NT (includes Windows 10 Mobile, and Xbox One onwards)	6.x (Vista, 7, 8, 8.1), 10 RTM-Anniversary Update	Yes	Yes	Yes	No	rdnssd-win32 provides an open source implementation of ND RDNSS
Windows NT (includes Windows 10 Mobile, and Xbox One onwards)	10 Creators Update and later	Yes	Yes	Yes	Yes	Windows 10 Creators Update introduces support for RFC 8106 (6106) RDNSS.
Windows Mobile	6.5	Yes	Yes	Lite	No	If the OEM explicitly unsets the SYSGEN_TCPIP6 pre-processor symbol, the built image will not have any IPv6 capabilities.
Windows Phone	7.5	No	No	No	No	
Windows Phone	8(.1)	Yes	Yes	Yes	No	Private lab research. No privacy extensions (RFC4941).
z/OS	V1R4.0	Yes	Yes	No	?	
z/VM	V5R1.0	Yes	Yes	No	No	
z/VSE	V4R2	Add-on	No	?	?	Via a third party TCP/IP stack, IP6/VSE from Barnard Software, Inc.

== Notes ==
- Operating systems that support neither DHCPv6 nor SLAAC cannot automatically configure unicast IPv6 addresses.
- Operating systems that support neither DHCPv6 nor ND RDNSS cannot automatically configure name servers in an IPv6-only environment.
