= Allied Telesis =

Technology company

Allied Telesis Holdings K.K.

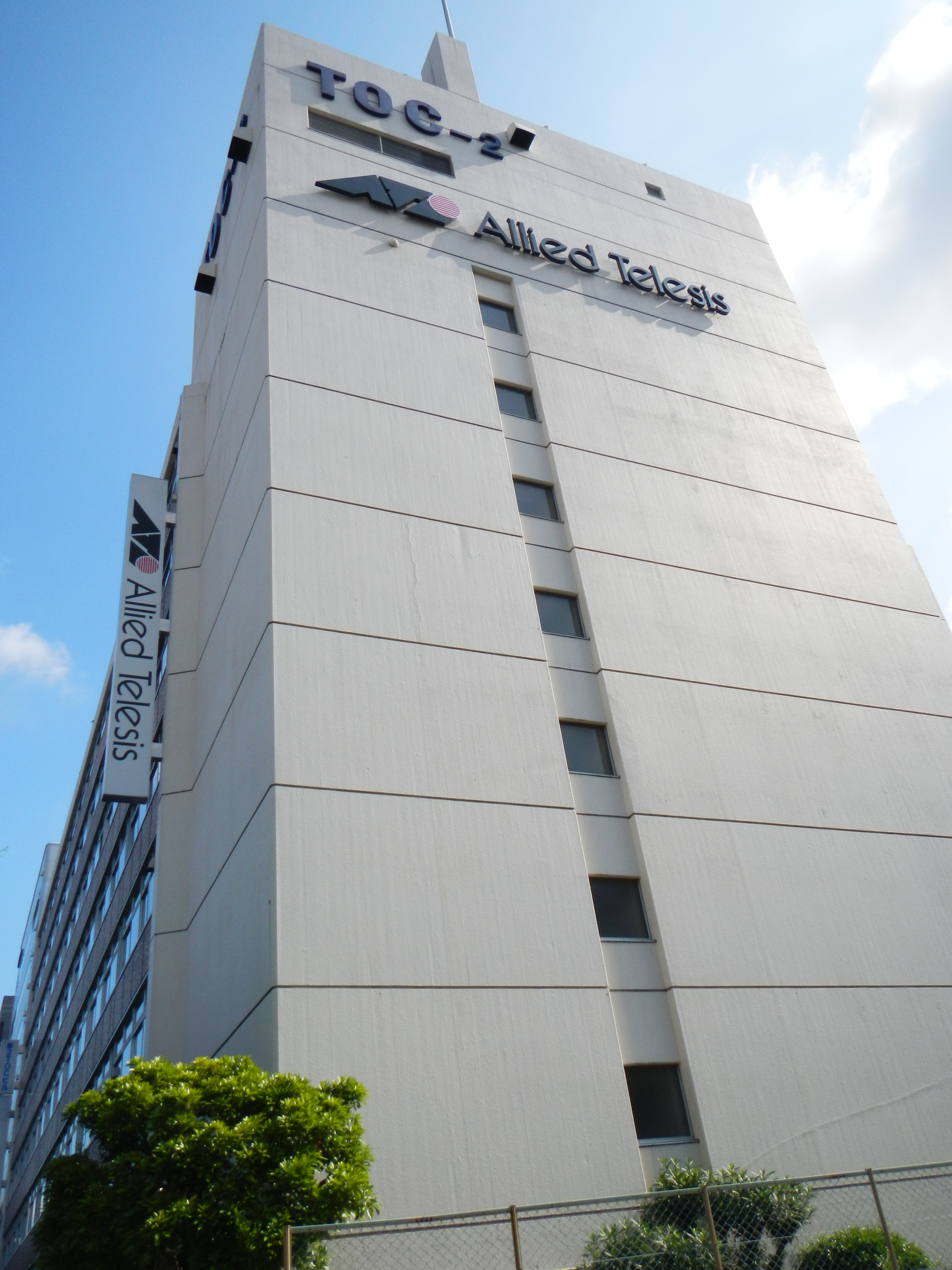
- Company headquarters in Gotanda, Tokyo
- Native name: アライドテレシス株式会社
- Type: Public (K.K)
- Traded as: TYO: 6835
- ISIN: JP3124900006
- Industry: Networking hardware
- Founded: 9 March 1987; 39 years ago
- Headquarters: Nishi-Gotanda, Shinagawa-ku, Tokyo 141-0031, Japan
- Area served: Worldwide
- Key people: Sachie Oshima (Chairman and CEO)
- Products: Switches; Routers; Firewalls
- Revenue: ▼¥28.39 billion (FY 2018) (US$ 262 million) (FY 2017)
- Net income: ▼¥211 million (FY 2017) (US$ 1.9 million) (FY 2017)
- Number of employees: 1,621 (consolidated, as of 31 December 2017)
- Website: Official website

Allied Telesis Holdings K.K. (アライドテレシス, Araido Tereshisu), formerly Allied Telesyn, is a network infrastructure–telecommunications company headquartered in Tokyo, Japan, with other branches in San Jose, California. The company was established in 1987 as a provider of Ethernet and IP access equipment along with IP triple play networks over copper and fiber access infrastructure.

== Company history ==
- March 1987, System Plus Co. is established with ¥1 million capital stock.
- September, 1987 The company is renamed Allied Telesis K.K.
- April 1990, Capital stock is increased to 99 million Yen.
- February 1991, Allied Telesyn Intl. (Asia) Pte., Ltd. is established in Singapore.
- June 1995, Allied Telesyn Intl. Pty Ltd. is established in Australia.
- November 1995, Malaysia Sales Office opens.
- June 1997, Capital stock is increased to 734 million Yen.
- July 1997, Taiwan Representative Office is launched.
- May 1999, Acquires a networking division from Teltrend Ltd., US.
- May 1999, Centrecom Systems Ltd. is established in UK.
- June 2000, Allied Telesyn Europe Service S.r.l. is established in Italy.
- June 2000, Allied Telesyn Korea Co., Ltd. is established in the Republic of Korea.
- July 2000, Allied Telesis K.K. is listed on the Second Section of the Tokyo Stock Exchange.
- October 2000, Allied Telesyn Labs New Zealand Ltd., an R&D center, is established in Christchurch, New Zealand.
- March 2001, Allied Telesyn Philippines Inc. is established in the Philippines as a software development base.
- March 2001, Allied Telesyn International m.b.H is established in Austria.
- September 2001, Allied Telesis (Suzhou) Co., Ltd. is established in China.
- October 2001, Allied Telesyn Networks Inc., an R&D center, is established in North Carolina, US.
- January 2002, Allied Telesis International SA is established in Switzerland.
- February 2002, Allied Telesyn International S.L.U. is established in Spain.
- July 2004, Allied Telesis K.K. is renamed Allied Telesis Holdings K.K.
- March 2005, Allied Telesis K.K. acquires ROOT Inc, a wireless networking company.
- May 2005, Allied Telesis Capital Corp is established in Washington state, US.
- December 2006, Allied Telesis Capital Corp opens branch on Yokota Air Base, Japan.
- June 2007, Allied Telesis launches Switchblade x908 Advanced Layer 3 High-capacity stackable chassis switch.
- July 2007, Allied Telesis Yokota AFB Branch rolls out IPTV as part of its IVVD contract with AAFES to the Yokota Community.
- Summer 2008, Allied Telesis Yokota AFB Branch adds 23 channels to its video lineup.
- September 2008, Allied Telesis Yokota AFB Branch upgrades to a tier one voice carrier for telephony calls to the states.
- November 2008, Allied Telesis launches "Green" Eco-friendly networking products to the market.
- October 2012, Allied Telesis launches SwitchBlade x8112 Advanced Layer 3 twelve-slot chassis switch.
- April 2014, Allied Telesis launches SBx81CFC960 controller card with terabit fabric for the SwitchBlade x8112.
- July 2014, Allied Telesis launches x310 series stackable edge switches.
- May 2015, Allied Telesis launches x930 series high-performance distribution switch.
- May 2015, Allied Telesis launches AR3050S and AR4050S Next-Generation Firewall appliances.
- August 2015, Sri Lanka's Expressway Traffic Management System adopts Allied Telesis Solutions.

== Products ==
Allied Telesis is primarily a provider of equipment for enterprise customers, educational and government segments, and businesses. The company offers POTS-to-10G iMAP (integrated Multiservice Access Platform) and iMG (intelligent Multiservice Gateways) with secure VPN routing equipment.

== See also ==
- AlliedWare Plus
- SwitchBlade
- List of networking hardware vendors
