= List of awards and nominations received by The Voice (American TV series) =

The Voice
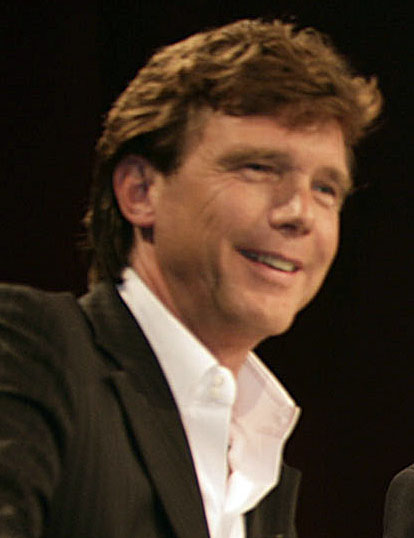
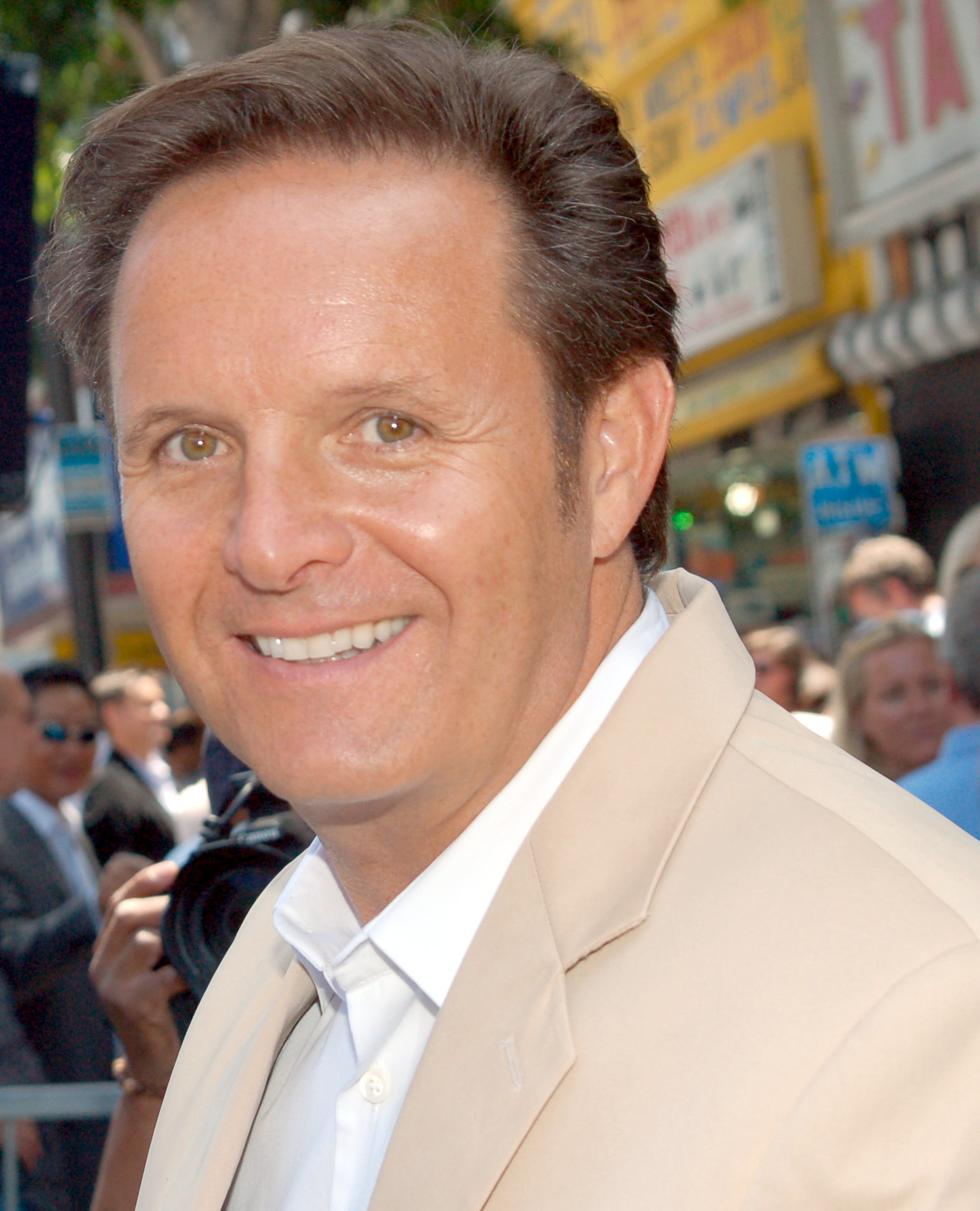
- John de Mol Jr. (left) and Mark Burnett (right) are among producers of The Voice who have received four Primetime Emmy awards for Outstanding Reality-Competition Program.
Awards and nominations
Award	Wins	Nominations
ADG Awards	0	4
ALMA Awards	1	2
ASCAP Film and Television Music Awards	6	6
Billboard Music Awards	2	3
GLAAD Media Awards	0	1
Critics' Choice Television Awards	4	8
Primetime Emmy Awards	7	41
Imagen Awards	0	2
Make-Up Artists and Hair Stylists Guild Awards	1	5
NAACP Image Awards	0	3
Nickelodeon Kids' Choice Awards	2	5
People's Choice Awards	6	9
Producers Guild of America Awards	4	5
Teen Choice Awards	5	15
Television Critics Association Awards	0	4
TV Guide Awards	3	3
Young Hollywood Awards	0	1

Totals (Note: Certain award groups do not simply award one winner. They acknowledge several different recipients, have runners-up, and have third place. Since this is a specific recognition and is different from losing an award, runner-up mentions are considered wins in this award tally. For simplification and to avoid errors, each award in this list has been presumed to have had a prior nomination.)
- Wins: 40
- Nominations: 117

The Voice is an American singing competition television series which premiered on NBC on April 26, 2011. Based on the original The Voice of Holland, the series features several stages of competition to search for new vocal talent contested by aspiring singers, age 13 or over, drawn from public auditions. The show has four coaches who choose their favourite artists during the audition rounds, and guide their selected teams through the remainder of the season. The winner is subsequently determined by television viewers; the prizes include $100,000 and a record deal with Universal Music Group. The Voice has been very successful since its premiere, drawing high ratings for the network and becoming one of the highest-rated shows in the country.

The Voice has been nominated for numerous awards, including forty Emmy Award nominations, winning six times, including three awards in the Outstanding Reality-Competition Program category and three awards for its lighting design. The Voice has additionally received nominations for six consecutive Critics' Choice Television Awards for Best Reality Series (four wins), seven People's Choice Awards (four wins), four Television Critics Association Awards and six Teen Choice Awards (three wins for the series), among other awards. The series has received nominations for its diversity, including one GLAAD Media Award, two Imagen Awards, and three NAACP Image Awards.

The behind-the-scenes personnel has been honored with multiple nominations, including ASCAP Film and Television Music Awards (six wins) for songwriting, four ADG Excellence in Production Design Awards, three Make-Up Artists & Hair Stylists Guild Awards (one win), and five Producers Guild of America Awards (four wins). The coaches of the show have won three awards out of nine nominations; Christina Aguilera has won an ALMA Award while Adam Levine and Shakira have both received a Teen Choice Award. Other coaches CeeLo Green and Blake Shelton have also received nominations. As of 2016, The Voice has won 36 awards from a total of 115 nominations.

== Awards and nominations ==
=== ADG Awards ===
The ADG Excellence in Production Design Award is presented annually by the American Art Directors Guild to recognize the best production design and art direction in the film and television industries. The Voice has been nominated four times.

Year	Category	Nominee(s)	Result	Ref.
2013	Excellence in Production Design Award: Multi-Camera Variety or Unscripted Series	Anron Goss, James Pearse Connelly, Zeya Maurer, Rick Vanzini, Anthony Bishop, Lydia Smyth, Kirsten Larsen, Scott Harper, Ed Strang, Jose Ramirez, and Lynn Brown	Nominated	
2014	Excellence in Production Design Award: Multi-Camera Variety or Unscripted Series	Anton Goss, James Pearse Connelly, Dave Edwards, Lydia Smyth, Zeya Maurer, Brittany Macwhorter, Ellen Jaworski, Ed Strang, Jose Ramirez, and Kristin O'Malley	Nominated	
2015	Excellence in Production Design: Variety, Competition, Reality, or Game Show Series	Anton Goss and James Pearse Connelly	Nominated	
2016	Excellence in Production Design: Variety, Reality or Competition Series	Anton Goss, James Pearse Connelly, Zeya Mauer, Lydia Smyth, Brittany Perham-MacWhorter, Kirsten Larsen, and Stephanie Hines.	Nominated	

=== ALMA Awards ===
The American Latino Media Arts Award, or simply ALMA Award, is an accolade presented annually to honor the best American Latino contributions to music, television, and film. Aguilera has won once as a coach.

Year	Category	Nominee(s)	Result	Ref.
2011	Favorite TV Reality, Variety, or Comedy Personality or Act	Christina Aguilera	Nominated	
2012	Favorite TV Reality, Variety, or Comedy Personality or Act	Christina Aguilera	Won	

=== ASCAP Film and Television Music Awards ===
The ASCAP Film and Television Music Award is presented by the American Society of Composers, Authors and Publishers to recognize the work of composers and songwriters in the film and television industries. The Voice has received six nominations and won every year between 2012 and 2017.

Year	Category	Nominee(s)	Result (Note: Awards in the categories do not have prior nominations and only winners are announced. For simplification and to avoid errors, each award in the list has been presumed to have had a prior nomination.)	Ref.
2012	Top Television Series	Jared Gutstadt, Jeff Peters, Rick Smith, and Schimer Music Productions	Won	
2013	Top Television Series	Matt Chambless, David Paul Dorn, Jared Gutstadt, Bill Markt, William McIntyre, Jeff Peters, Jordan Sears, Rick Smith, and Schimer Music Productions	Won	
2014	Top Television Series	Matt Chambless, David Paul Dorn, Jared Gutstadt, William Markt, William McIntyre, Steven Page, Jeffrey Peters, Schimmer Music Productions, Jordan Sears, and Evan Marshall Wise	Won	
2015	Top Television Series	Jared Gutstadt, Jeff Peters, and Schimmer Music Productions	Won	
2016	Top Television Series	Matt Chambless, Jared Gutstadt, Jeff Peters, and Schimmer Music Productions	Won	
2017	Top Television Series	Matt Chambless, Jared Gutstadt, Jeff Peters, and Schimmer Music Productions	Won	

=== Billboard Mid-Year Music Awards ===
Voted online on Billboard's official website, the Billboard Mid-Year Music Award honors artists and shows for their achievements in music in the first half of the year in the United States. The Voice has won twice.

Year	Category	Nominee(s)	Result	Ref.
2011	Best Music Reality Show	The Voice	Nominated	
2012	Best Music Reality Show	The Voice	Won	
2013	Best Music Reality Show	The Voice	Won	

=== Critics' Choice Television Awards ===
The Critics' Choice Television Award is an annual accolade bestowed by the American Broadcast Television Journalists Association in recognition of outstanding achievements in television, since 2011. The Voice has won four times out of six nominations, excluding two nominations for Carson Daly as host.

Year	Category	Nominee(s)	Result	Ref.
2012	Best Reality Series – Competition	The Voice	Won	
2013	Best Reality Series – Competition	The Voice	Won	
2014	Best Reality Show Host	Carson Daly	Nominated	
2014	Best Reality Series – Competition	The Voice	Nominated	
2015	Best Reality Series – Competition	The Voice	Nominated	
2016	Best Reality Series – Competition	The Voice	Won	
2017	Best Reality Show Host	Carson Daly	Nominated	
2017	Best Reality Series – Competition	The Voice	Won	

==== Critics' Choice Real TV Awards ====
The Critics' Choice Real TV Awards are presented by the Broadcast Television Journalists Association and NPACT, which recognizes excellence in nonfiction, unscripted and reality programming across broadcast, cable and streaming platforms. The Voice has won three times out of four nominations.

Year	Category	Nominee(s)	Result	Ref.
2019	Best Competition Series: Talent/Variety	The Voice	Nominated	
2019	Best Live Show	The Voice	Won	
2020	Best Competition Series: Talent/Variety	The Voice	Won	
2021	Best Competition Series: Talent/Variety	The Voice	Won	

=== Emmy Awards ===
The Emmy Awards were established in 1949 in order to recognize excellence in the American television industry, and are bestowed by members of the Academy of Television Arts & Sciences. Emmy Awards are given in different ceremonies presented annually; Primetime Emmy Awards recognize outstanding work in American primetime television programming, while Creative Arts Emmy Awards are presented to honor technical and creative achievements, and include categories recognizing work of art directors, lighting and costume designers, cinematographers, casting directors, and other production-based personnel. As of 2016, The Voice has won six times out of forty-one nominations; three times in the Outstanding Reality-Competition Program category and three times for the show's lighting design.

==== Primetime Emmy Awards ====
Year	Category	Nominee(s)	Result	Ref.
2012	Outstanding Competition Program	John de Mol, Mark Burnett, Audrey Morrissey, Stijn Bakkers, Lee Metzger, Chad Hines, Jim Roush, Amanda Zucker, Nicolle Yaron, Mike Yurchuk, Dean Houser, Joni Day, Teddy Valenti, May Johnson, David Offenheiser, and Carson Daly	Nominated	
2013	Outstanding Competition Program	John de Mol, Mark Burnett, Audrey Morrissey, Stijn Bakkers, Lee Metzger, Chad Hines, Jim Roush, Amanda Zucker, Nicolle Yaron, Mike Yurchuk, Kyra Thompson, Teddy Valenti, May Johnson, Carson Daly, Ashley Baumann, and Keith Dinielli	Won	
2014	Outstanding Competition Program	Mark Burnett, John de Mol, Audrey Morrissey, Stijn Bakkers, Lee Metzger, Chad Hines, Nicolle Yaron, Amanda Zucker, Mike Yurchuk, Jim Roush, Kyra Thompson, May Johnson, Teddy Valenti, Ashley Baumann, Carson Daly, Keith Dinielli, Barton Kimball, Kyley Tucker, and Brittany Martin	Nominated	
2015	Outstanding Competition Program	Mark Burnett, John de Mol, Audrey Morrissey, Marc Jensen, Lee Metzger, Chad Hines, Amanda Zucker, Mike Yurchuk, Jim Roush, Kyra Thompson, May Johnson, Teddy Valenti, Anthea Bhargava, Clyde Lieberman, Ashley Baumann, Keith Dinielli, Barton Kimball, Brittany Martin, Kyley Tucker, Carson Daly, and Michelle McNulty	Won	
2016	Outstanding Competition Program	John de Mol, Mark Burnett, Audrey Morrissey, Jay Bienstock, Lee Metzger, Chad Hines, Kyra Thompson, Amanda Zucker, Mike Yurchuk, Anthea Bhargava, Keith Dinielli, May Johnson, Clyde Lieberman, Teddy Valenti, Ashley Baumann-Sylvester, Kyley Tucker, Carson Daly, Barton Kimball, Michelle McNulty, and Brittany Martin Porter	Won	
2017	Outstanding Competition Program	John De Mol, Mark Burnett, Audrey Morrissey, Jay Bienstock, Lee Metzger, Chad Hines, Kyra Thompson, Amanda Zucker, Anthea Bhargava, Keith Dinielli, May Johnson, Clyde Lieberman, Teddy Valenti, Ashley Baumann-Sylvester, Barton Kimball, Brittany Martin Porter, Kyley Tucker, Amanda Silva Borden, Carson Daly, and Dan Paschen	Won	
2018	Outstanding Competition Program	John De Mol, Mark Burnett, Audrey Morrissey, Stijn Bakkers, Lee Metzger, Chad Hines, Kyra Thompson, Mike Yurchuk, Amanda Zucker, Anthea Bhargava, Keith Dinielli, Clyde Lieberman, Teddy Valenti, Ashley Baumann-Sylvester, Barton Kimball, Brittany Martin Porter, Kyley Tucker, Valentina May Johnson, Amanda Silva Borden, Carson Daly, Dan Paschen, Tod Schellinger, and Jared Wyso	Nominated	
2019	Outstanding Competition Program	John De Mol, Mark Burnett, Audrey Morrissey, Stijn Bakkers, Amanda Zucker, Kyra Thompson, Teddy Valenti, Kyley Tucker, Anthea Bhargava, Melysa Lovell Garratt, Clyde Lieberman, Brittany Martin Porter, Barton Kimball, Dan Paschen, Amanda Silva Borden, Tod Schellinger, Carson Daly, Jared Wyso, and Hayley Opalek McSherry	Nominated	
2021	Outstanding Competition Program	John de Mol, Mark Burnett, Audrey Morrissey, Adam Sher, Amanda Zucker, Kyra Thompson, Teddy Valenti, Kyley Tucker, Anthea Bhargava, Melysa Garratt, Clyde Lieberman, Brittany Martin Porter, Bart Kimball, Dan Paschen, Amanda Silva Borden, Tod Schellinger, Carson Daly, Jared Wyso and Hayley Opalek McSherry	Nominated	

==== Primetime Creative Arts Emmy Awards ====
Year	Category	Nominee(s)	Result	Ref.
2012	Outstanding Hairstyling for a Multi-Camera Series Or Special	Shawn Finch, Jerilynn Stephens, Cindy Costello, Cheryl Marks, Renee Dipinto Ferruggia, and Samantha Wen	Nominated	
2012	Outstanding Lighting Design/Lighting Direction for a Variety Series	Oscar Dominguez and Daniel Boland	Nominated	
2012	Outstanding Art Direction For Variety Or Nonfiction Programming	Anton Goss, James Connelly, and Zeya Maurer	Nominated	
2013	Outstanding Technical Direction, Camerawork, Video Control for a Series	Allan Wells, John Repczynski, Suzanne Ebner, Diane Biederbeck, Dave Hilmer, Manny Bonilla, Marc Hunter, Steve Martyniuk, Scott Kaye, Scott Hylton, Joe Coppola, Guido Frenzel, Alex Hernandez, Jofre Rosero, Steve Simmons, and Terrance Ho	Nominated	
2013	Outstanding Art Direction For Variety Or Nonfiction Programming	Anton Goss, James Pearse Connelly, and Zeya Maurer	Nominated	
2013	Outstanding Hairstyling for a Multi-Camera Series Or Special	Shawn Finch, Jerilynn Stephens, Renee Dipinto Ferruggia, Cheryl Marks, Corey "Chill" Hill, and Kathleen Leonard	Nominated	
2013	Outstanding Lighting Design/Lighting Direction for a Variety Series	Oscar Dominguez, Daniel Boland, Samuel Barker, and Craig Housenick	Won	
2014	Outstanding Sound Mixing for a Variety Series Or Special	Michael Abbott, Kenyata Westbrook, Robert P. Matthews Jr., John Koster, Randy Faustino, Ryan Young, Christian Schrader, Tim Hatayama, Michael Bernard, Andrew Fletcher, Bill Dietzman, and Eddie Marquez	Nominated	
2014	Outstanding Picture Editing For Reality Programming	John M. Larson, Hudson H. Smith III, Robert M. Malachowski Jr., William Fabian Castro, Eric B. Shanks, Jason Stewart, Robby Thompson, Noel Guerra, and James Munoz	Nominated	
2014	Outstanding Makeup for a Multi-Camera Series Or Special (Non-Prosthetic)	Darcy Gilmore, Sherri Simmons, Thea Samuels, Kristene Bernard, Carlene Kearns, and Molly Tissavary	Nominated	
2014	Outstanding Lighting Design/Lighting Direction for a Variety Series	Oscar Dominguez, Samuel Barker, Craig Housenick, Daniel Boland, and Johnny Bradley	Nominated	
2014	Outstanding Interactive Program	The Voice (via NBC.com)	Nominated	
2014	Outstanding Hairstyling for a Multi-Camera Series Or Special	Shawn Finch, Jerilynn Stephens, Renee Ferruggia, Samantha Wen, Corey "Chill" Hill, and Cheryl Marks	Nominated	
2014	Outstanding Cinematography For Reality Programming	Alex Van Wagner, Steve Lopez, Adam Tash, Markos Alvarado, Jeffrey Wilkins, Edgar Martin, Graham Steele, and Dom Zanghi	Nominated	
2014	Outstanding Art Direction For Variety, Nonfiction, Reality or Reality-Competition Programming	Anton Goss, James Pearse Connelly, Zeya Maurer, Lydia Smyth, and Kristen O'Malley	Nominated	
2014	Outstanding Technical Direction, Camerawork, Video Control for a Series	Allan Wells, Diane Biederbeck, Danny Bonilla, Manny Bonilla, Suzanne Ebner, Guido Frenzel, Alex Hernandez, Dave Hilmer, Marc Hunter, Scott Hylton, Katherine Iacofano, Scott Kaye, Steve Martyniuk, Jofre Rosero, Steve Simmons, and Terrance Ho	Nominated	
2015	Outstanding Hairstyling for a Multi-Camera Series Or Special	Shawn Finch, Jerilynn Stephens, Renee DiPinto-Ferruggia, James Dunham, Giannandrea Marongiu, and Stacey Morris	Nominated	
2015	Outstanding Lighting Design/Lighting Direction for a Variety Series	Oscar Dominguez, Samuel Barker, Daniel Boland, Craig Housenick, and Johnny Bradley	Won	
2015	Outstanding Production Design For Variety, Nonfiction, Reality or Reality-Competition Programming	Anton Goss, James Pearse Connelly, Zeya Maurer, and Lydia Smyth	Nominated	
2015	Outstanding Sound Mixing for a Variety Series Or Special	Michael Abbott, Kenyata Westbrook, Robert P. Matthews Jr., John Koster, Ryan Young, Randy Faustino, Brian R. Riordan, Tim Hatayama, Andrew Fletcher, Christian Schrader, Michael Bernard, Eric White, Michael Parker, Eddie Marquez, and Bill Dietzman	Nominated	
2015	Outstanding Technical Direction, Camerawork, Video Control for a Series	Allan Wells, Diane Biederbeck, Danny Bonilla, Suzanne Ebner, Guido Frenzel, Alex Hernandez, Dave Hilmer, Marc Hunter, Scott Hylton, Katherine Iacofono, Scott Kaye, Steve Martyniuk, Jofre Rosero, Steve Simmons, Bryan Trieb, and Terrance Ho	Nominated	
2016	Outstanding Production Design for a Variety, Nonfiction, Reality Or Reality-Competition Series	Anton Goss, James Pearse Connelly, Zeya Maurer, Lydia Smyth, and Stephanie Trigg Hines	Nominated	
2016	Outstanding Picture Editing for a Structured Or Competition Reality Program	Editing Team	Nominated	
2016	Outstanding Lighting Design/Lighting Direction for a Variety Series	Oscar Dominguez, Samuel Barker, Daniel K. Boland, Craig Housenick, and Johnny Bradley	Won	
2016	Outstanding Sound Mixing for a Variety Series Or Special	Michael Abbott, Randy Faustino, Kenyata Westbrook, John Koster, Robert P. Matthews Jr., Sterling Cross, Ryan Young, Brian Riordan, Tim Hatayama, Eric White, William Dietzman, Eddie Marquez, Christian Schrader, and Andrew Fletcher	Nominated	
2016	Outstanding Technical Direction, Camerawork, Video Control for a Series	Allan Wells, Terrance Ho, Diane Biederbeck, Suzanne Ebner, Guido Frenzel, Nick Gomez, Alex Hernandez, Dave Hilmer, Marc Hunter, Scott Hylton, Katherine Iacofono, Scott Kaye, Ron Lehman, Jofre Rosero, Steve Simmons, and Dan Webb	Nominated	
2017	Outstanding Production Design for a Variety, Nonfiction, Reality Or Reality-Competition Series	Anton Goss, James Pearse Connelly, Zeya Maurer, Brittany MacWhorter, and Stephanie Hines	Nominated	
2017	Outstanding Hairstyling for a Multi-Camera Series Or Special	Jerilynn Stephens, Meagan Herrera-Schaaf, Cory Rotenberg, Anna Maria Orzano, Stacey Morris, and Derbie Wieczorek	Nominated	
2017	Outstanding Lighting Design/Lighting Direction for a Variety Series	Oscar Dominguez, Sam Barker, Daniel Boland, and Johnny Bradley	Nominated	
2017	Outstanding Makeup for a Multi-Camera Series Or Special (Non-Prosthetic)	Darcy Gilmore, Kristene Bernard, Thea Samuels, Gina Ghiglieri, Diane Mayo, and Jackie Dobbie	Nominated	
2017	Outstanding Sound Mixing for a Variety Series Or Special	Ryan Young, Brian Riordan, Michael Abbott, Eric White, Tim Hatayama, Randy Faustino, Kenyata Westbrook, Sterling Cross, Robert P. Matthews Jr., John Koster, Andrew Fletcher, Christian Schrader, Carlos Torres, William Dietzman, and Michael Bernard	Nominated	
2017	Outstanding Technical Direction, Camerawork, Video Control for a Series	Allan Wells, Terrance Ho, Diane Biederbeck, Danny Bonilla, Suzanne Ebner, Gudio Frenzel, Alex Hernandez, Dave Hilmer, Marc Hunter, Scott Hylton, Katherine Iacofono, Scott Kaye, Ron Martynuk, John Perry, Jofre Rosero, and Steve Simmons	Nominated	
2017	Outstanding Casting for a Reality Program	Michelle McNulty, Holly Dale, and Courtney Burns	Nominated	
2017	Outstanding Short Form Variety Series	Chad Hines, Amanda Horning, and Suzanne Lee (Behind The Voice)	Nominated	
2017	Outstanding Creative Achievement in Interactive Media within an Unscripted Program	The Voice On Snapchat Show	Nominated	
2018	Outstanding Directing for a Reality Program	Alan Carter	Nominated	
2018	Outstanding Casting for a Reality Program	Michelle McNulty, Holly Dale, and Courtney Burns	Nominated	
2018	Outstanding Hairstyling for a Multi-Camera Series Or Special	Jerilynn Stephens, Meagan Herrera-Schaaf, Renee Ferruggia, Derrick Spruill, Alyn Topper, and Darbie Wieczorek	Nominated	
2018	Outstanding Lighting Design/Lighting Direction for a Variety Series	Oscar Dominguez, Daniel Boland, Craig Housenick, Johnny Bradley, and Ronald Wirsgalla	Nominated	
2018	Outstanding Makeup for a Multi-Camera Series Or Special (Non-Prosthetic)	Darcy Gilmore, Kristene Bernard, Gina Ghiglieri, and Kathleen Karridene	Nominated	
2018	Outstanding Picture Editing for a Structured or Competition Reality Program	John M. Larson, Robert Michael Malachowski Jr, Hudson H. Smith III, Matt Antell, Roger Bartlett, Sean Basaman, Kevin Benson, Matthew Blair, Melissa Silva Borden, William Fabian Castro, Grady Cooper, A.J. Dickerson, Glen Ebesu, Noel A. Guerra, John Homesley, Omega Hsu, Ryan P. James, Charles A. Kramer, James J. Munoz, Rich Remis, David I. Sowell, Robby Thompson, and Eric Wise	Nominated	
2018	Outstanding Production Design for a Variety, Nonfiction, Reality Or Reality-Competition Series	Anton Goss, James Pearse Connelly, Lydia Smith, Zeya Maurer, and Stephanie Hines	Nominated	
2018	Outstanding Sound Mixing for a Variety Series Or Special	Michael Abbott, Randy Faustino, Kenyata Westbrook, John Koster, Robert P. Matthews Jr., Brian Riordan, Ryan Young, Tim Hatayama, Eric White, Shaun Sebastian, Michael Bernard, Carlos Torres, Christian Schrader, and Andrew Fletcher	Nominated	
2018	Outstanding Technical Direction, Camerawork, Video Control for a Series	Allan Wells, Terrance Ho, Bert Atkinson, Manny Bonilla, Danny Bonilla, Martin J. Brown Jr., Suzanne Ebner, Guido Frenzel, Nick Gomez, Alexander Hernandez, Marc Hunter, Scott Hylton, Scott Kaye, Steve Martyniuk, David Plakos, Jofre Rosero, and Steve Simmons	Nominated	
2021	Outstanding Casting for a Reality Program	Michelle McNulty, Holly Dale, and Courtney Burns	Nominated	
2021	Outstanding Directing for a Reality Program	Alan Carter	Nominated	
2021	Outstanding Contemporary Hairstyling for a Variety, Nonfiction or Reality Program	Jerilynn Stephens, Amber Maher, Kimi Messina, Dean Banowetz, Dwayne Ross, Regina Rodriguez, Stacey Morris, and Robert Ramos	Nominated	
2021	Outstanding Lighting Design/Lighting Direction for a Variety Series	Oscar Dominguez, Ronald Wirsgalla, Andrew Munie, Daniel K. Boland, and Tiffany Spicer Keys	Nominated	
2021	Outstanding Picture Editing for a Structured Reality or Competition Program	John M. Larson, Robert Michael Malachowski Jr., Hudson H. Smith III, Matt Antell, John Baldino, Sommer Basinger, Matthew Blair, Melissa Silva Borden, William Fabian Castro, Nick Don Vito, Alyssa Dressman Lehner, Glen Ebesu, Noel A. Guerra, John Homesley, Omega Hsu, Charles A. Kramer, Terry Maloney, James J. Munoz, Andy Perez, Robby Thompson, and Eric Wise	Nominated	
2021	Outstanding Technical Direction, Camerawork, Video Control for a Series	Allan Wells, Mano Bonilla III, Martin J. Brown Jr., Robert Burnette, Suzanne Ebner, Guido Frenzel, Alex Hernandez, Marc Hunter, Scott Hylton, Kathrine Iacofano, Scott Kaye, Steve Martyniuk, David Plakos, Ray Reynolds, Jofre Rosero, Steve Simmons, and Terrance Ho	Nominated	

=== GLAAD Media Awards ===
The GLAAD Media Award was established in 1990 by the American Gay & Lesbian Alliance Against Defamation to "recognize and honor media for their fair, accurate and inclusive representations of the LGBT community and the issues that affect their lives." The Voice has received two nominations.

Year	Category	Nominee(s)	Result	Ref.
2012	Outstanding Reality Program	The Voice	Nominated	
2022	Outstanding Reality Program	The Voice	Nominated	
2023	Outstanding Reality Program	The Voice	Nominated	

=== Imagen Awards ===
The Imagen Award is organized by the Imagen Foundation, an American organization with a purpose to "recognize and reward positive portrayals of Latinos in all forms of media". The Voice has been nominated twice.

Year	Category	Nominee(s)	Result	Ref.
2013	Best Variety or Reality Show	The Voice	Nominated	
2014	Best Variety or Reality Show	The Voice	Nominated	

=== Make-Up Artists and Hair Stylists Guild Awards ===
The American Make-Up Artists and Hair Stylists Guild presents annual awards to honor achievements of make-up artists and hair stylists in films, television shows, commercials and live theater events. The Voice has won once.

Year	Category	Nominee(s)	Result	Ref.
2014	Best Contemporary Hair Styling – Television and New Media Series	Shawn Finch and Jerilynn Straitiff	Won	
2015	Best Contemporary Hair Styling – Television and New Media Series	Shawn Finch, Jerilynn Straitiff, and Cheryl Marks	Nominated	
2016	Best Contemporary Hair Styling – Television and New Media Series	Shawn Finch, Jerilynn Straitiff, and Renee Ferruggia	Nominated	
2017	Best Contemporary Make-up – Television and New Media Series	Darcy Gilmore, Kristene Bernard, and Diane Mayo	Nominated	
2017	Best Contemporary Hair Styling – Television and New Media Series	Jerilynn Stephens, Meagan Herrera-Schaaf, and Renee Ferruggia	Nominated	

=== NAACP Image Awards ===
The NAACP Image Award, presented annually by the American National Association for the Advancement of Colored People, was established 1967 to honor people of color for their work in film, television, music, and literature. The Voice has been nominated three times.

Year	Category	Nominee(s)	Result	Ref.
2014	Outstanding Reality Series	The Voice	Nominated	
2015	Outstanding Reality Series	The Voice	Nominated	
2016	Outstanding Reality Program/Reality Competition Series	The Voice	Nominated	

=== Nickelodeon Kids' Choice Awards ===
The Nickelodeon Kids' Choice Awards, which are presented annually, were launched by Nickelodeon in 1988. The Voice has won two awards.

Year	Category	Nominee(s)	Result	Ref.
2013	Favorite Reality Show	The Voice	Nominated	
2014	Favorite Reality Show	The Voice	Nominated	
2015	Favorite Talent Competition Show	The Voice	Won	
2016	Favorite Talent Competition Show	The Voice	Won	
2017	Favorite Reality Show	The Voice	Nominated	
2019	Favorite Reality Show	The Voice	Nominated	
2020	Favorite Reality Show	The Voice	Nominated	
2021	Favorite Reality Show	The Voice	Nominated	

=== People's Choice Awards ===
The People's Choice Awards are presented annually by Procter & Gamble and were first introduced in 1975. The awards show recognizes the work of popular culture, voted on by the general public. The Voice has won eight times.

Year	Category	Nominee(s)	Result	Ref.
2012	Favorite TV Competition Show	The Voice	Nominated	
2013	Favorite TV Competition Show	The Voice	Nominated	
2014	Favorite TV Competition Show	The Voice	Won	
2015	Favorite TV Competition Show	The Voice	Won	
2016	Favorite TV Competition Show	The Voice	Won	
2016	Favorite TV Show	The Voice	Nominated	
2017	Favorite TV Competition Show	The Voice	Won	
2018	The Competition Show of 2018	The Voice	Won	
2021	The Competition Show of 2021	The Voice	Won	

=== Producers Guild of America Awards ===
The Producers Guild of America Award is established by the Producers Guild of America to honor the producing teams in film, television and new media. The Voice has four wins out of six nominations.

Year	Category	Nominee(s)	Result	Ref.
2013	Outstanding Producer of Competition Television	The Voice	Nominated	
2014	Outstanding Producer of Competition Television	The Voice	Won	
2015	Outstanding Producer of Competition Television	The Voice	Won	
2016	Outstanding Producer of Competition Television	The Voice	Won	
2017	Outstanding Producer of Competition Television	The Voice	Won	
2019	Outstanding Producer of Competition Television	The Voice	Nominated	

=== Teen Choice Awards ===
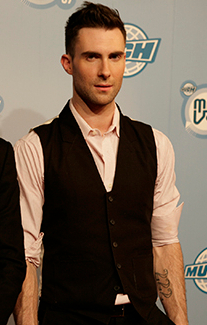
Adam Levine has been nominated for a Teen Choice Award three times winning once in 2014.

The Teen Choice Awards are presented annually by the Fox Broadcasting Company. The Voice and the show's coaches have been nominated fifteen times; the reality show itself has won three times while Levine and Shakira have each won one award as coaches.

Year	Category	Nominee(s)	Result	Ref.
2011	Choice TV: Reality Competition Show	The Voice	Nominated	
2011	Choice TV: Breakout Show	The Voice	Won	
2011	Choice TV: Personality	Christina Aguilera	Nominated	
2011	Choice TV: Personality	Adam Levine	Nominated	
2012	Choice TV: Reality Competition Show	The Voice	Nominated	
2012	Choice TV Personality: Male	Cee Lo Green	Nominated	
2012	Choice TV Personality: Female	Christina Aguilera	Nominated	
2013	Choice TV: Reality Competition Show	The Voice	Nominated	
2013	Choice TV Personality: Male	Adam Levine	Nominated	
2013	Choice TV Personality: Male	Blake Shelton	Nominated	
2014	Choice TV: Reality Competition Show	The Voice	Won	
2014	Choice TV Personality: Male	Adam Levine	Won	
2014	Choice TV Personality: Female	Shakira	Won	
2015	Choice TV: Reality Show	The Voice	Won	
2016	Choice TV: Reality Show	The Voice	Nominated	
2017	Choice TV: Reality Show	The Voice	Won	
2018	Choice TV: Reality Competition Show	The Voice	Nominated	
2018	Choice TV Personality	Kelly Clarkson	Nominated	

=== Television Critics Association Awards ===
The TCA Award is an annual accolade awarded by the Television Critics Association in recognition of outstanding achievements in television. The Voice has received nominations every year between 2011 and 2014.

Year	Category	Nominee(s)	Result	Ref.
2011	Outstanding Achievement in Reality Programming	The Voice	Nominated	
2012	Outstanding Achievement in Reality Programming	The Voice	Nominated	
2013	Outstanding Achievement in Reality Programming	The Voice	Nominated	
2014	Outstanding Achievement in Reality Programming	The Voice	Nominated	

=== TV Guide Awards ===
The TV Guide Awards are presented by American magazine TV Guide, with winners chosen by the readers to honor television programs and performers in American television. The Voice has won three times.

Year	Category	Nominee(s)	Result	Ref.
2012	Favorite Singing Competition	The Voice	Won	
2013	Favorite Reality Competition	The Voice	Won	
2014	Favorite Reality Competition Show	The Voice	Won	

=== Young Hollywood Awards ===
The Young Hollywood Awards are bestowed annually to honor the achievements in pop music, film and television, sports, fashion and social media. The Voice has been nominated once.

Year	Category	Nominee(s)	Result	Ref.
2014	Reality Royalty	The Voice	Nominated	
