= Abrizio =

Semiconductor company

- Type: Fabless
- Industry: Semiconductor
- Founded: 1997
- Founder: Nick McKeown
- Defunct: 1999
- Fate: Acquired by PMC-Sierra
- Headquarters: United States
- Key people: Nick McKeown (CTO); Anders Swahn (CEO); Zubair Hussein (VP of Engineering)
- Products: TT1 switch fabric chip set

Abrizio was a fabless semiconductor company which made switching fabric chip sets (integrated circuits for computer network switches). Its chip set, the TT1, was used by several large system development companies as the core switch fabric in their high value communication systems.

== Founding ==
Abrizio was founded in 1997, by Professor Nick McKeown as a spinout of the Tiny-tera project at Stanford University. It received US$6M of funding from Benchmark Capital and Sequoia Capital.

== Product and technology ==
The product name TT1 referred to "Tiny Tera" meaning a small, highly integrated semiconductor implementation of a terabit/s capacity switching fabric. The Stanford program demonstrated a scalable packet switch that had a terabit-per-second performance in CMOS. Abrizio was the first to introduce a more optimized Input-Buffered Output Queued Switch Fabrics, which addressed the memory efficiency issue of similar technologies. Its technology made better use of memory, making the TT1 a less expensive product. Abrizio's key technology was a sophisticated implementation of a Wavefront arbiter which allowed the switch to make complex arbitration decisions very quickly.

== Senior leadership ==
In 1998, Anders Swahn, who had been executive vice president of sales and marketing at Allied-Telesyn Inc., joined Abrizio as chief executive. Abrizio's corporate colors were purple and yellow. The CEO of Abrizio was Anders Swahn. The CTO was McKeown who was taking a leave from his professorship at Stanford. Zubair Hussein was the V.P. of Engineering.

== Acquisition ==
Abrizio was acquired on August 24, 1999, by PMC-Sierra for 4,352,000 shares of PMC-Sierra stock, worth at that time $400M. After the acquisition, the former Abrizio development team completed the TTx switch chip set. In the wake of the bursting of the telecom bubble, PMC-Sierra laid off most of the former Abrizio team in 2001.
