= Modular switch =

Electrical network switch which can use field-replaceable units

A modular switch or chassis switch is a type of network switch which can be configured using field-replaceable units. These units, often referred to as blades, can add more ports, bandwidth, and capabilities to a switch. These blades can be heterogenous, and this allows for a network based on multiple different protocols and cable types. Blades can typically be configured in a parallel or failover configuration, which can allow for higher bandwidth, or redundancy in the event of failure. Modular switches also typically support hot-swap of switch modules, this can be very important in managing downtime. Modular switches also support additional line cards which can provide new functions to the switch that would previously have been unavailable, such as a firewall. An example of a modular computer network switch is the Cisco Catalyst 6500, which can be configured with up to 13 slots, and supports connections from RJ45 to QSFP+.

== See also ==
- Stackable switch
