= List of networking hardware manufacturers =

Networking hardware typically refers to equipment facilitating the use of a computer network. Typically, this includes routers, switches, access points, network interface cards and other related hardware. This is a list of notable vendors who produce network hardware.

== Routers ==
- ADTRAN
- Aerohive Networks - acquired by Extreme Networks
- Alaxala Networks
- Allied Telesis
- Alcatel Lucent Enterprise - Stellar
- Arcadyan
- Arris International
- Aruba Networks - acquired by HPE
- Asus (including subsidiary Askey Computer Corp.)
- Avaya - acquired Nortel, networking business sold to Extreme Networks
- AVM
- Barracuda Networks
- Brocade - acquired Vyatta, partially purchased by Broadcom and partially by Extreme Networks.
- Billion Electric
- Calix
- Cisco Systems
- Control4 - acquired by SnapAV
- Cradlepoint - acquired by Ericsson
- Dell - acquired Force10
- Digi International
- DrayTek
- D-Link
- ECI Telecom
- Enterasys - acquired by Extreme Networks in 2013
- Ericsson - acquired Redback
- Extreme Networks
- FiberHome
- Fortinet
- HPE - acquired 3Com and Aruba Networks
- Hisense Broadband - now Ligent
- Huawei Routers
- Juniper Networks - acquired by HPE
- Linksys - acquired by Belkin
- Meraki - acquired by Cisco Systems
- MikroTik
- Mitsubishi
- Motorola
- NEC
- Netgear
- Nokia
- Nokia Networks
- Open Mesh - acquired by Datto
- QNAP Systems
- RAD Data Communications
- Ribbon Communications
- Rohde & Schwarz Networks and Cybersecurity
- Ruckus Networks - acquired by Brocade; acquired by ARRIS
- Ruijie Networks
- Sagemcom
- Sierra Wireless
- Silver Peak - acquired by HPE
- Technicolor SA
- Telco Systems
- Teltonika
- TP-Link (including Mercusys)
- TRENDnet
- Ubiquiti
- USRobotics
- Xiaomi
- Xirrus - acquired by Cambium
- Yamaha
- ZTE
- ZyXEL

=== Router SoC ===
- Broadcom (includes former Avago and Emulex)
- Cortina Systems (including former StormSemi/StorLink)
- Geode (processor)
- HiSilicon
- MaxLinear (includes former Intel/Lantiq)
- Mediatek (includes former TrendChip/Econet/Ralink/Airoha)
- Qualcomm (includes former Atheros)
- Realtek

== Network switches ==
- ADTRAN
- AirPro
- Aerohive Networks - acquired by Extreme Networks
- Alaxala Networks
- Alcatel-Lucent Enterprise
- Allied Telesis
- AMG Systems
- Arista Networks
- Avaya - acquired Nortel
- Buffalo Technology
- Brocade Communications Systems - acquired Foundry Networks - was acquired by Ruckus Networks, An ARRIS company and Extreme Networks
- Ciena
- Cisco Systems
- Control4 - acquired by SnapAV
- Dell Networking
- DrayTek
- D-Link
- ECI Telecom
- EnGenius
- Enterasys - acquired by Extreme Networks
- Extreme Networks
- Fortinet
- HPE - acquired ProCurve, 3Com, H3C, TippingPoint and Aruba Networks
- Huawei
- Juniper Networks
- Linksys - acquired by Belkin
- Mellanox - acquired by NVIDIA
- Meraki - acquired by Cisco Systems
- MikroTik
- Netgear
- Nokia Networks
- NEC
- Open Mesh - acquired by Datto
- Oracle Corporation
- QNAP Systems
- Rad Group
- Rohde & Schwarz Networks and Cybersecurity
- Ruckus Networks - acquired some Brocade product lines; Ruckus was acquired by ARRIS; Arris International was acquired by CommScope
- Ruijie Networks
- Telco Systems
- Teledata Networks
- Teltonika
- TP-Link
- TRENDnet
- Ubiquiti
- Yamaha
- ZTE
- ZyXEL

== Wireless ==
- ADTRAN/BlueSocket
- Aerohive Networks - acquired by Extreme Networks
- Alaxala Networks
- Alcatel-Lucent Enterprise
- Allied Telesis
- Alvarion
- Aruba - acquired by HPE
- Asus
- Avaya
- AVM
- Belkin
- Buffalo Technology
- Ceragon
- Cisco
- CommScope
- Control4 - acquired by SnapAV
- DrayTek
- D-Link
- EnGenius
- Enterasys - acquired by Extreme
- Ericsson
- Extreme Networks
- Fortinet
- HPE
- Huawei
- Juniper - acquired Trapeze & Mist
- Linksys - acquired by Belkin
- Meraki - acquired by Cisco
- Meru - acquired by Fortinet
- MikroTik
- Motorola
- NEC
- Netgear
- Nokia Networks
- Open Mesh - acquired by Datto
- Proxim
- Ruckus Networks - acquired by Brocade; then acquired by ARRIS; then acquired by CommScope
- Ruijie Networks
- Siae Microelettronica
- Samsung
- Sierra Wireless
- Siklu
- Teltonika
- TP-Link
- TRENDnet
- Ubiquiti
- WatchGuard
- Xirrus - acquired by Cambium Networks
- Yamaha
- ZyXEL

=== Wireless controller ===
- Broadcom (includes former Avago and Emulex)
- Intel
- Mediatek (includes former Ralink)
- Qualcomm (includes former Atheros)
- Realtek

== Network interface card ==
- Allied Telesis
- AMD (includes former Solarflare and Xilinx)
- Broadcom (includes former Avago and Emulex)
- Buffalo Technology
- Cavium (formerly QLogic)
- Chelsio
- Cisco
- D-Link
- Huawei
- Intel
- Marvell
- Napatech
- Nvidia (includes former Mellanox)
- Oracle Corporation
- QNAP Systems
- Realtek
- TRENDnet
- ZyXEL

=== Ethernet controller ===
- ASIX
- Intel
- JMicron
- Marvell Technology
- Qualcomm (includes former Atheros)
- Realtek

== Server appliance ==
- aiScaler
- Avaya
- Symantec
- Cisco
- Ciena
- Exinda
- Expand
- F5
- HPE
- Infoblox
- Lanner Inc
- Lotus Foundations
- Nortel
- Oracle Corporation
- PSSC Labs
- Radware
- Riverbed Technology
- Secure64
