= Alaxala Networks =

Japanese networking hardware company

Alaxala Networks Corp.
- Native name: アラクサラ ネットワークス 株式会社
- Company type: Subsidiary
- Industry: Networking hardware
- Founded: 2004; 22 years ago
- Headquarters: Kawasaki, Kanagawa, Japan
- Key people: Yoshihiro Takayasu
- Products: Network router; Network switch
- Revenue: JPY 19.2 billion
- Total assets: JPY 5.505 billion
- Number of employees: 310 (2008)
- Parent: Fortinet
- Website: www.alaxala.com

Alaxala Networks Corp. (アラクサラネットワークス株式会社, Arakusara Nettowākusu Kabushiki-gaisha), commonly known as its brand Alaxala, is a Japanese subsidiary of Fortinet headquartered in Kawasaki, Kanagawa, Japan, that offers networking hardware products.

== Overview ==
In 2004, Alaxala Networks Corp. was originally established, as the merger between Hitachi and NEC networking hardware divisions. The name of Alaxala was derived from "ALL Access for eXpert and Latent Association", and more that "Ala" in Latin means "Wing", and "X" means "networking eXchange", so the company intended the two "Ala" (Hitachi and NEC) connected and collaborated by "X" tightly. The company is basically fabless company, designing the products, mostly ordering to manufacture them to Hitachi enterprise servers division factory in Hadano, Kanagawa, Japan. The company offers networking hardware products, network router and network switch etc. Alaxala products are sold and installed mostly in Japanese domestic market and for enterprises, but we can find several products at some online shopping, Amazon.com etc.. The business type and scope is same as Allied Telesis, that is also the company in Japan. And they are collaborated for producing networking hardware sold in both brands.

Alaxala official agencies are Hitachi, NEC, Itochu Techno-Solutions, Net One Systems, and Alaxala has contributed to offer the various networking hardware products to major communication companies in Japan, such as NTT, KDDI, Softbank, and others.

On August 24, 2012, Alaxala was known that Tokyo Stock Exchange (TSE) announced that TSE core system outage happened due to the software bugs on Alaxala networking hardware.

Alaxala also sponsors IT professional certifications for Alaxala products, like Cisco, Oracle, and others.

On the 11th of March, 2021, Fortinet purchased a 75% stake in Alaxala

== See also ==
- List of companies of Japan
- List of networking hardware vendors
