= Liepkalnis =

Village in Vilnius County, Lithuania

Liepkalnis is an area of Vilnius, Lithuania, located within the Rasos eldership, east of Naujininkai eldership. It is the highest point of land in Vilnius, the Hill of Laimis at 235 metres (771 ft) high.

== History ==
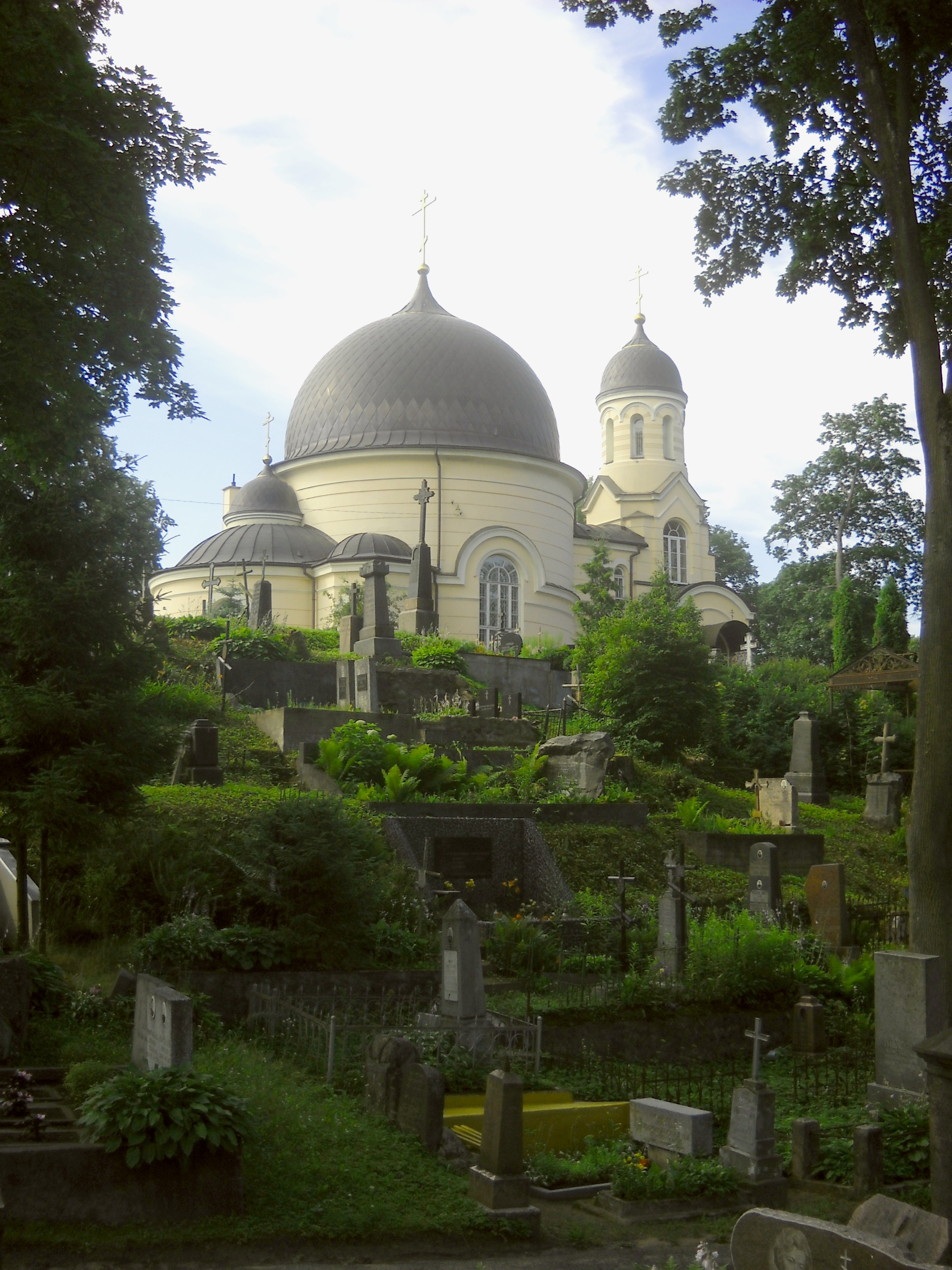
Church of St. Euphrosyne of Polotsk, built in 1838

841 people lived in Liepkalnis in 1905. By 1931, the population had decreased to 619 people. On 25 November 2024, Swiftair Flight 5960 crashed in Liepkalnis.

== Facilities ==
It is home to the Liepkalnis Winter Sports Centre, LFF Stadium. The Church of St. Euphrosyne of Polotsk was built in 1838. The historic Eastern Orthodox, Karaites and Tatar cemeteries are also located in Liepkalnis.

== Gallery ==
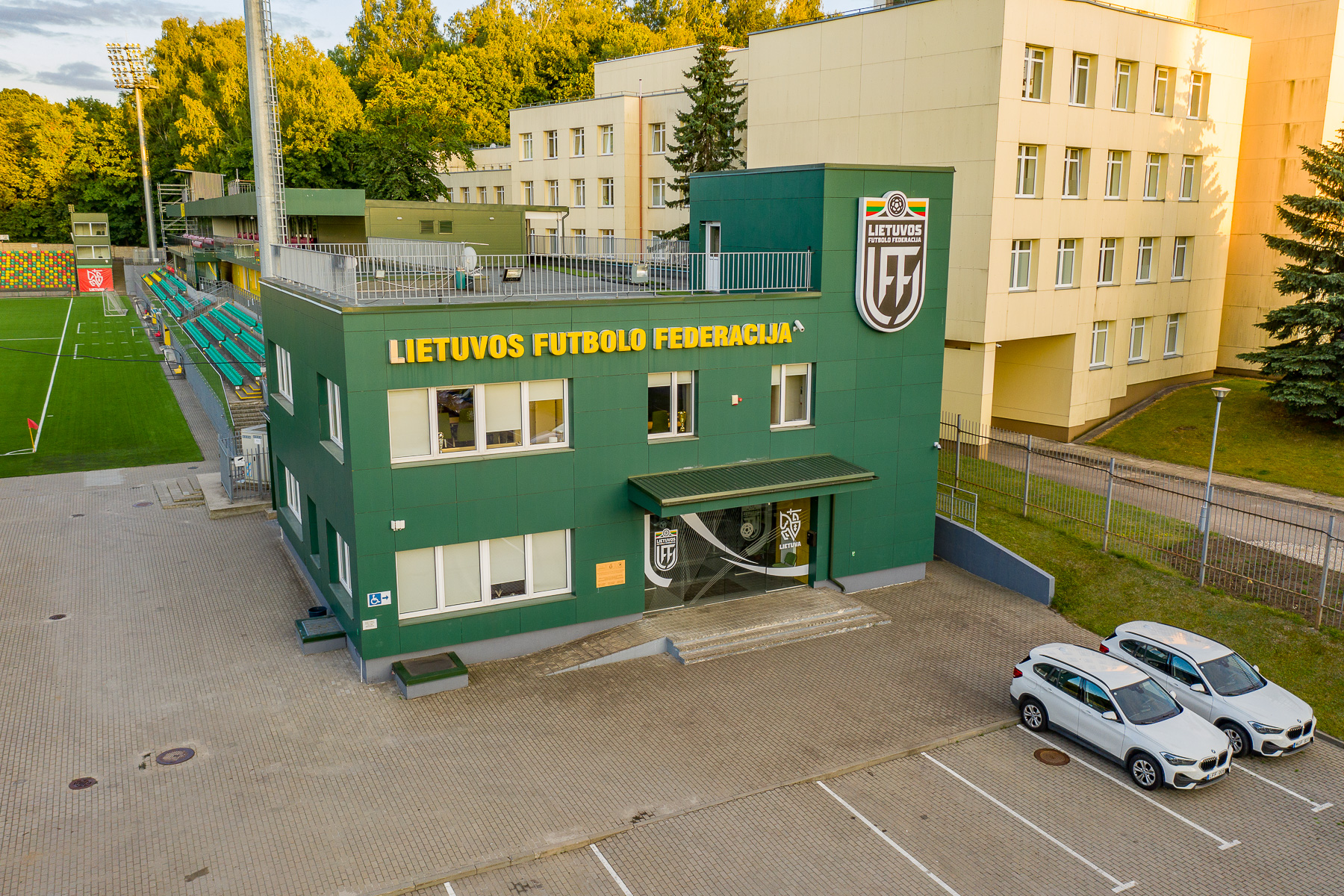
Lithuanian Football Federation

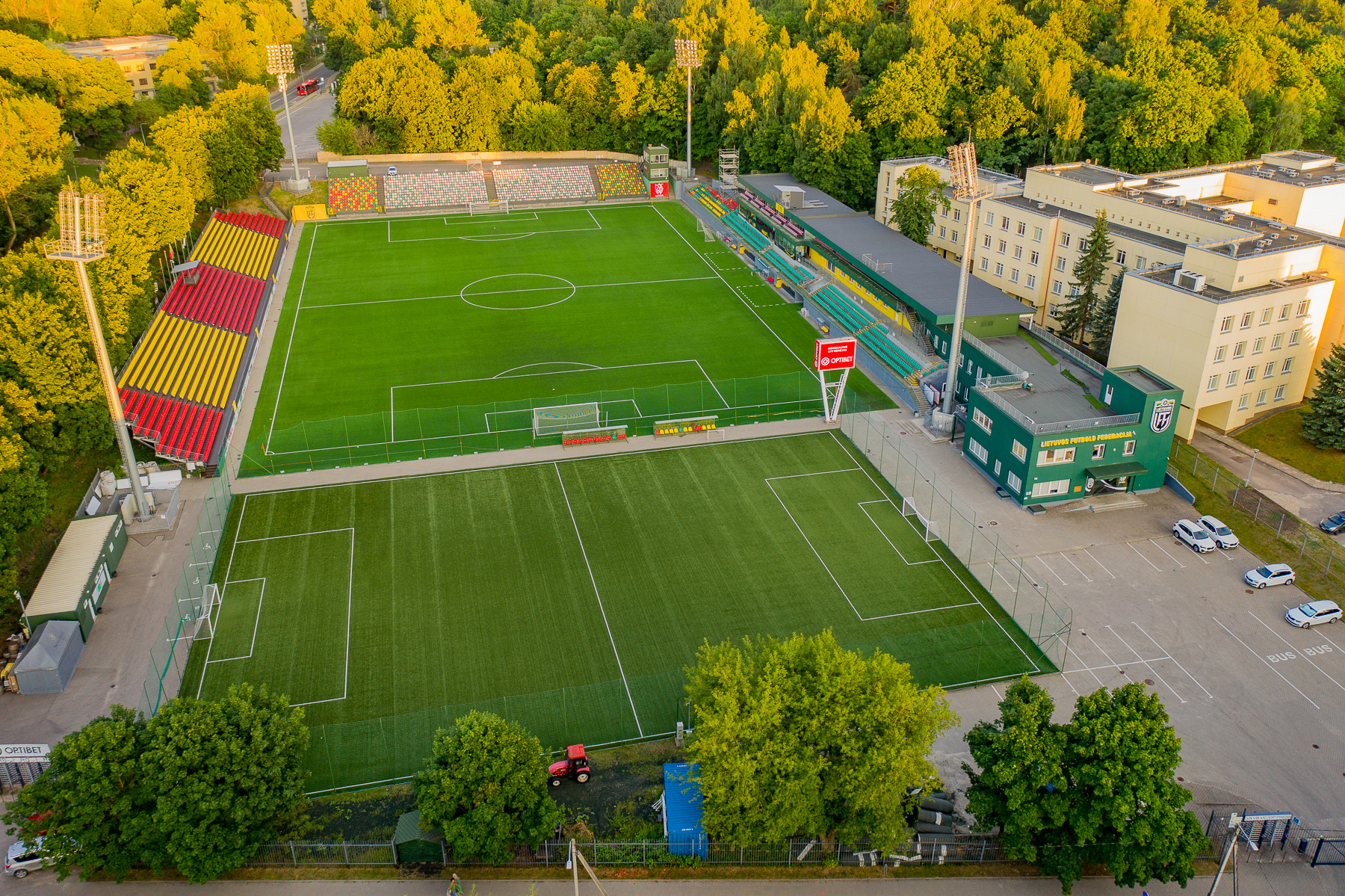
LFF Stadium

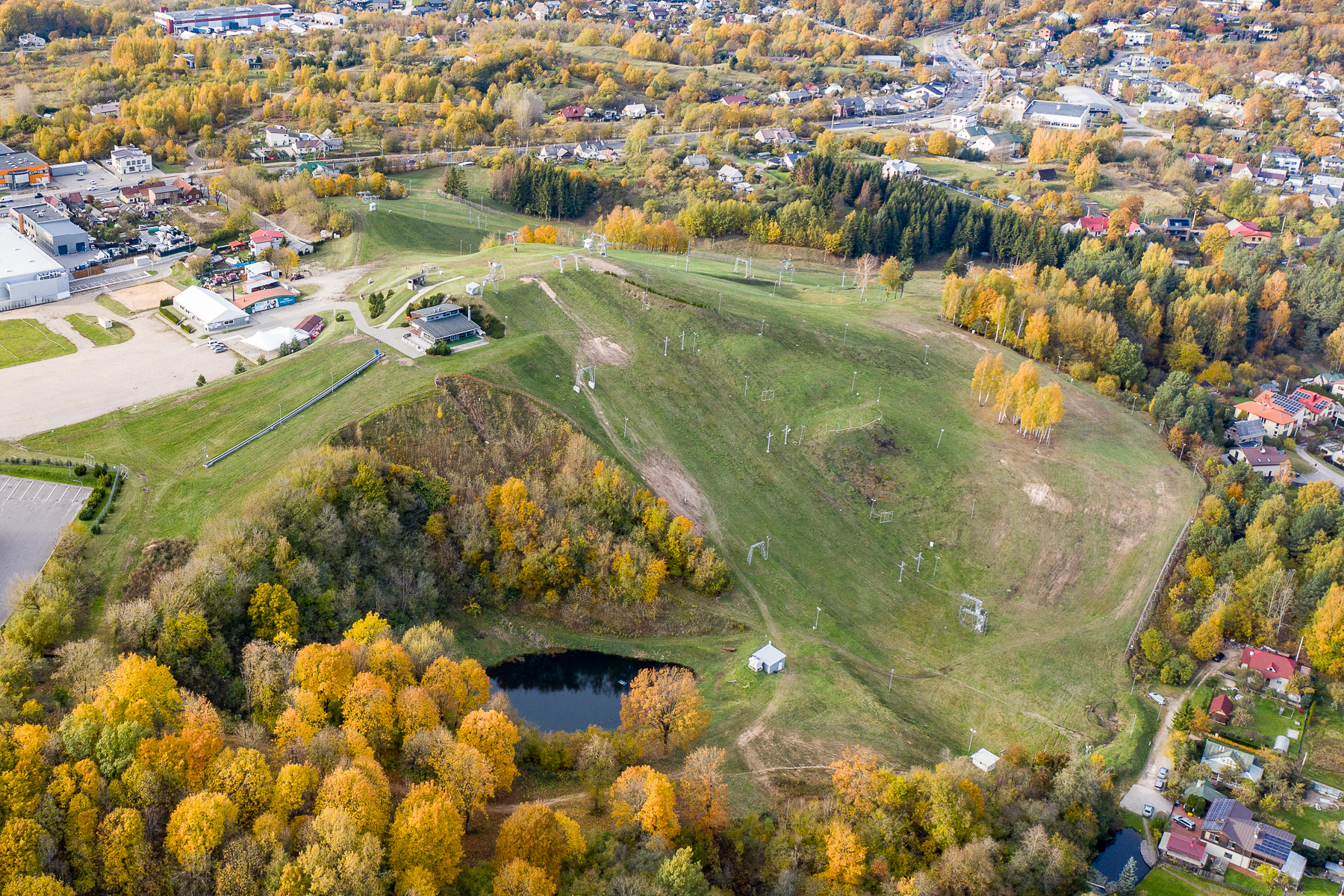
Liepkalnis Winter Sports Centre

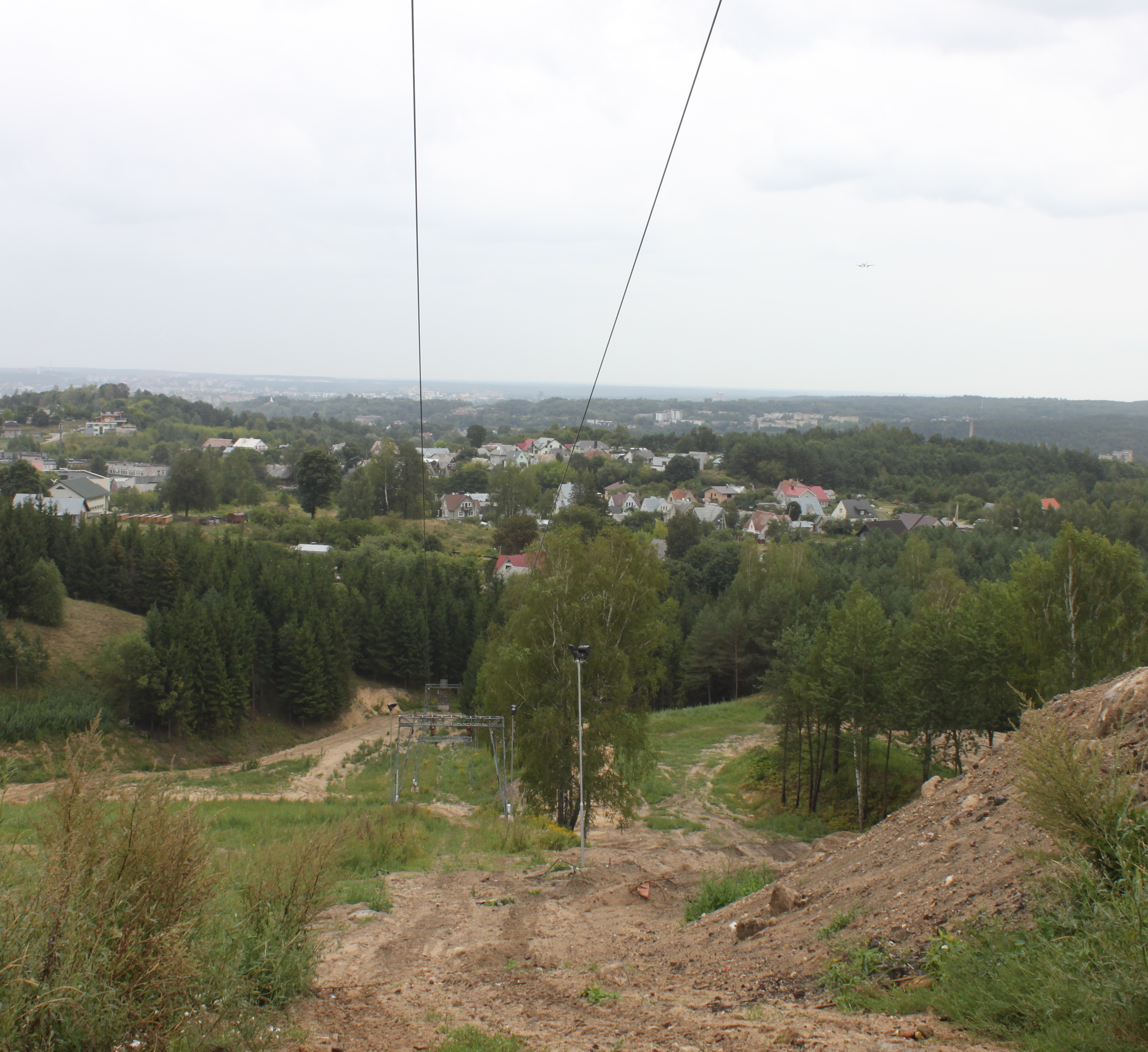
View from the Hill of Laimis

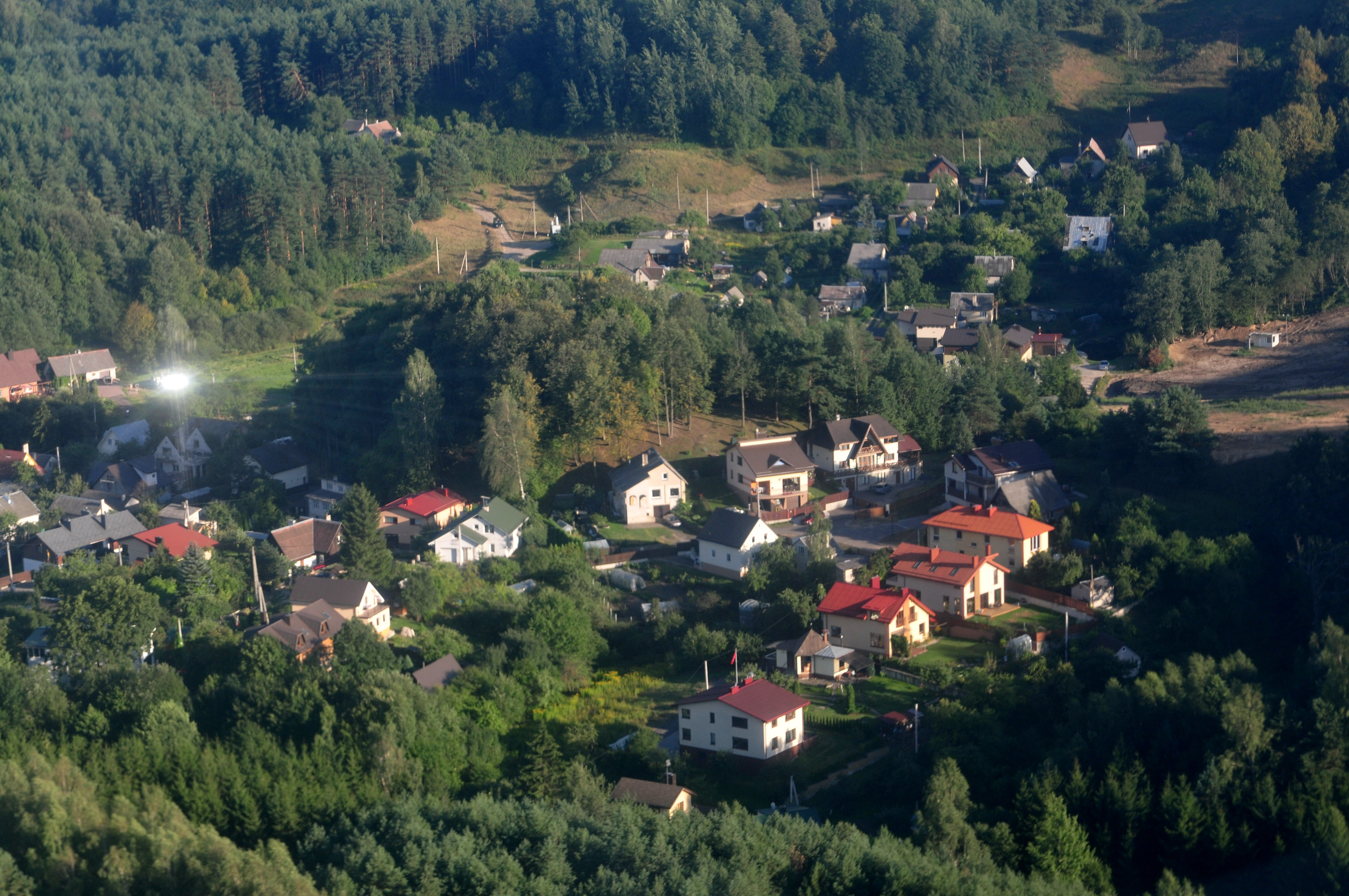
Houses on Scythes and Vieversiai streets
