= Rasos =

Rasos can refer to:

- Rasos (district), a district in Vilnius, capital of Lithuania
- Rasos Cemetery, the oldest cemetery in Vilnius
- Saint Jonas' Festival, a Lithuanian festival during the summer solstice
