= Cross Telecom =

- Company type: Private
- Industry: Telecommunications
- Founded: 1996
- Founder: Michael Fischler
- Headquarters: Bloomington, Minnesota Corporate and National; Sales Office; 10900 Nesbitt Avenue South Bloomington, MN 55437, USA
- Area served: United States
- Key people: CEO Bob Coughlin, Executive VP Sales and Marketing John DeLozier, CFO Mike Bevilacqua, CTO David Lover, VP CPS Operations Doug Lang, VP Managed Services Wade Hoffman
- Products: Communication solutions
- Services: Planning, design implementation and ongoing technical support for Advanced Communications solutions
- Revenue: Fiscal Year-End – December 2008 Sales (mil.) 115.5 est.
- Number of employees: 300+ (2009)
- Partnerships: Avaya, Cisco, Extreme Networks
- Acquisitions: American Communication Technologies, Inc.
- Website: www.crosstelecom.com

Cross Telecom (founded in 1996) is located in Bloomington, Minnesota. Cross is a company produces a range of products and services relating to the telecommunications industry that include: VOIP, networking, unified communications, Avaya maintenance & support, and professional services. Cross is an Avaya National Platinum Business Partner, Avaya Platinum DevConnect Business Partner, Cisco Silver Certified Partner, and Extreme Networks Diamond Partner. Cross' partnership with Extreme Networks provides communication and network solutions. Cross is also a member of the Avaya Services Delivery Specialisation (SDS) program. The SDS program gives Cross access to provide services in implementation, maintenance support and application integration. Cross Telecom provides services across verticals such as: federal government, health care and education.

== Cross University ==
Cross University is located in a 82,000-square-foot (7,600 m^{2}) facility in Bloomington, Minnesota. Cross University has such programs as: Cross Briefing, Training and Demo Center, equipped with communications technology.
