= Enterasys Networks =

American networking company

Enterasys Networks, Inc.
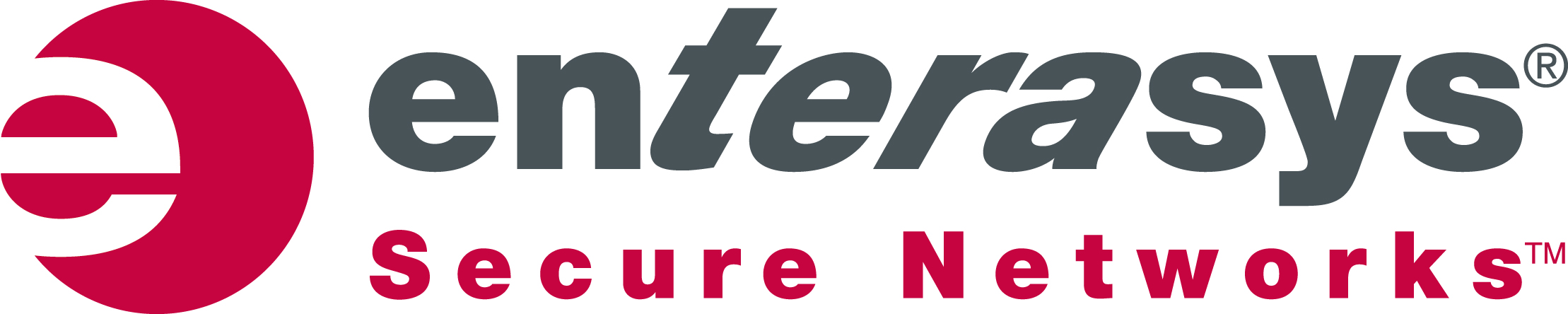
- Industry: Computer networking
- Predecessor: Cabletron Systems Inc
- Founded: March 1983 as Cabletron Systems, Listed on NYSE as Enterasys in August 2001
- Fate: Acquired by Extreme Networks in September 2013
- Successor: Extreme Networks
- Headquarters: Salem, New Hampshire, U.S.
- Products: Switches, Routers, Network Security Software
- Website: www.enterasys.com

Enterasys Networks, Inc. was an American networking company. Enterasys products included networking equipment ranging from routers, switches, and IEEE 802.11 wireless access points and controllers. The company formed in March 2000 as a spin-off of Cabletron Systems.

In addition to networking hardware such as switches, routers and wireless products, the company sold software for managing and securing networks such as intrusion prevention systems, network access control and security information management.

The company's headquarters were in Salem, New Hampshire.

== History ==
Enterasys had their initial public offering on August 6, 2001, with its shares trading on the New York Stock Exchange under symbol ETS.

It claimed a $12.9 million profit in its first quarter after it was spun out of Cabletron in June 2001. A restatement in 2002 for recognizing revenue in improper time periods resulted in several quarters of losses.

An investigation by the US Securities and Exchange Commission and shareholder lawsuits was settled in October 2003 for $50.4 million. In 2004, a former executives pleaded guilty for fraud.

At a December 2006 trial, four former executives were sentenced to prison terms and several others found guilty.

In November 2005, Enterasys was acquired by Alec Gores' private equity firm, Gores Group, and Tennenbaum Capital Partners, in a going-private transaction estimated at $386 million. In April 2006, The Gores Group named Mike Fabiaschi as CEO. Fabiaschi had to deal with renewing trust relationships with customers, to "fix the company." In 2008, Enterasys sought to increase revenue to $1 billion and make one or two acquisitions.

On July 29, 2008, The Gores Group announced its partnership with Siemens to acquire the German company's enterprise communications business, known as Siemens Enterprise Communications. The Gores Group acquired a 51% stake in Siemens Enterprise Communications (SEN). As part of the $550 million transaction, Gores Group offered two of its assets: Enterasys and SER Solutions, a Virginia-based contacts management provider.

On September 22, 2008, Fabiaschi died suddenly. Mark Stone, chairman of the board, was named interim CEO and completed the joint venture transaction. Chris Crowell became CEO and president of Enterasys.

Enterasys enterprise networking and SEN's telephony and wireless products were integrated.

Meanwhile, appeals from the fraud cases continued through 2009.

On September 12, 2013, Extreme Networks announced they would acquire Enterasys for about $180 million cash.

== See also ==
- List of networking hardware vendors
