= Teltonika =

Lithuanian electronics manufacturer

Teltonika IoT Group
- Type: Private
- Industry: Internet of Things; Electronics manufacturing
- Founded: 1998; 28 years ago in Kaunas, Lithuania
- Founder: Arvydas Paukštys
- Headquarters: Vilnius, Lithuania
- Area served: Worldwide
- Key people: Arvydas Paukštys (Founder); Marius Derenčius (CEO)
- Products: Vehicle telematics; Industrial networking hardware; Electric vehicle charging equipment; Telemedicine devices; Security systems
- Number of employees: 3,400 (2026)
- Website: www.teltonika-iot-group.com

Teltonika IoT Group is a Lithuanian high-technology company group specializing in the design, development, and manufacturing of Internet of Things (IoT) solutions, with in-house manufacturing supporting its product lines in vehicle telematics, industrial networking hardware, electric vehicle charging equipment, telemedicine devices, and security solutions. The group operates internationally, with its principal headquarters and manufacturing facilities located in Vilnius and Molėtai, Lithuania.

== History ==
=== Founding and early years ===
Teltonika was established in 1998 by Arvydas Paukštys in Vilnius, Lithuania.

The company's first products included a glucose-measuring device, a timing system, and a current meter.

During the late 1990s and early 2000s, Teltonika pivoted toward mobile telecommunications and eventually toward vehicle tracking systems and M2M communication.

In 2003, Teltonika introduced its first GPS tracking device, the T-BOX N12, marking the beginning of its telematics business niche.

=== Expansion into telematics and networking ===
Through the 2000s and 2010s, Teltonika expanded steadily into GPS tracking, fleet management hardware, and industrial networking equipment.

In 2005, the company launched its first fleet management platform, TAVL.

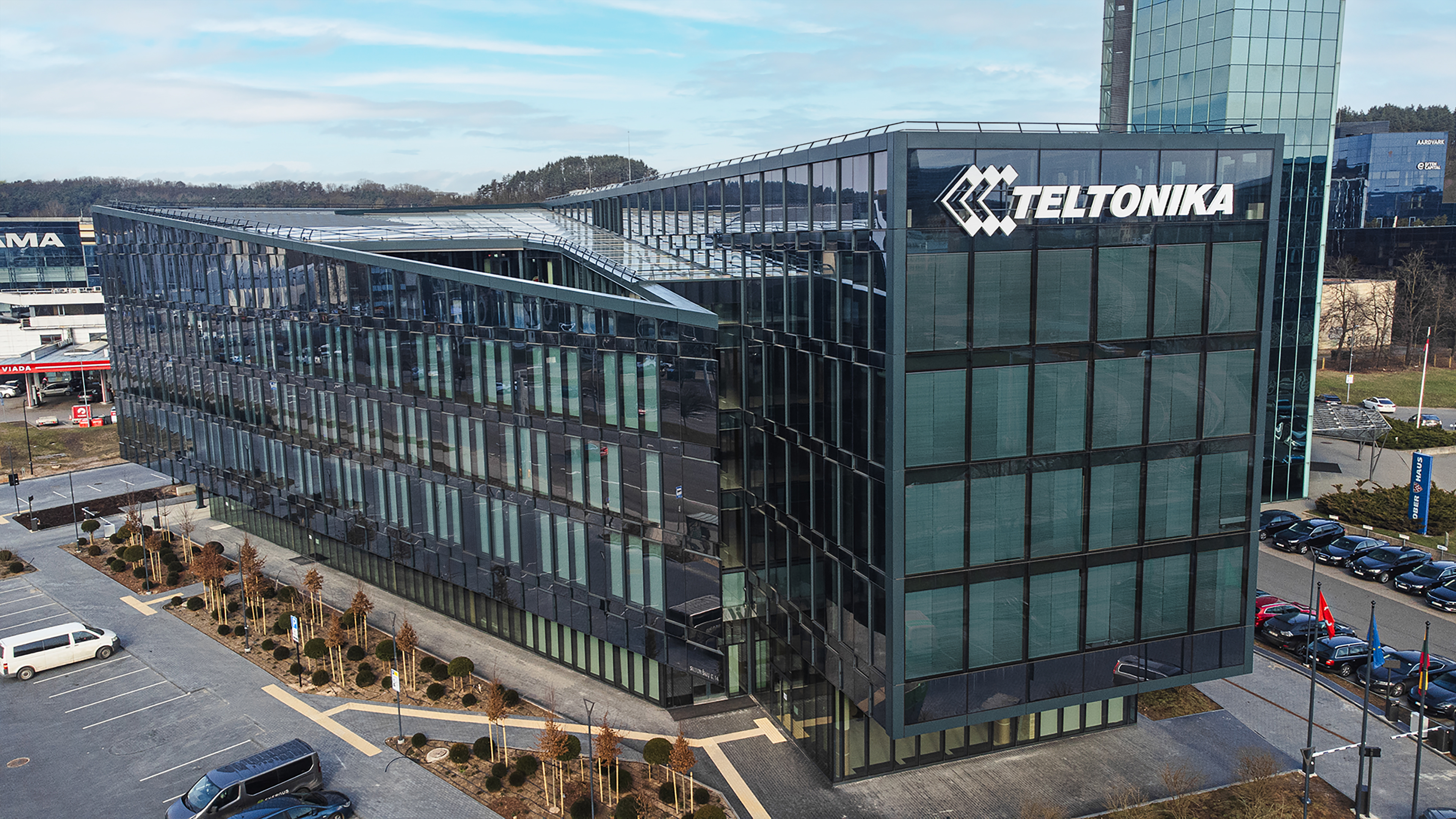
Teltonika HQ in Vilnius

A first surface-mount technology (SMT) production line was opened in Liepkalnis district in Vilnius in 2006.

In 2007, Teltonika introduced its first cellular router, the RUT100, establishing its industrial networking business niche, and produced its first GSM module, the TM2.

International expansion began in 2008 with the opening of the first foreign offices in Hong Kong and Pakistan, alongside a new division in Kaunas, Lithuania. The company adopted an export-oriented business model, selling primarily to system integrators and fleet operators outside Lithuania.

=== Growth and restructuring ===
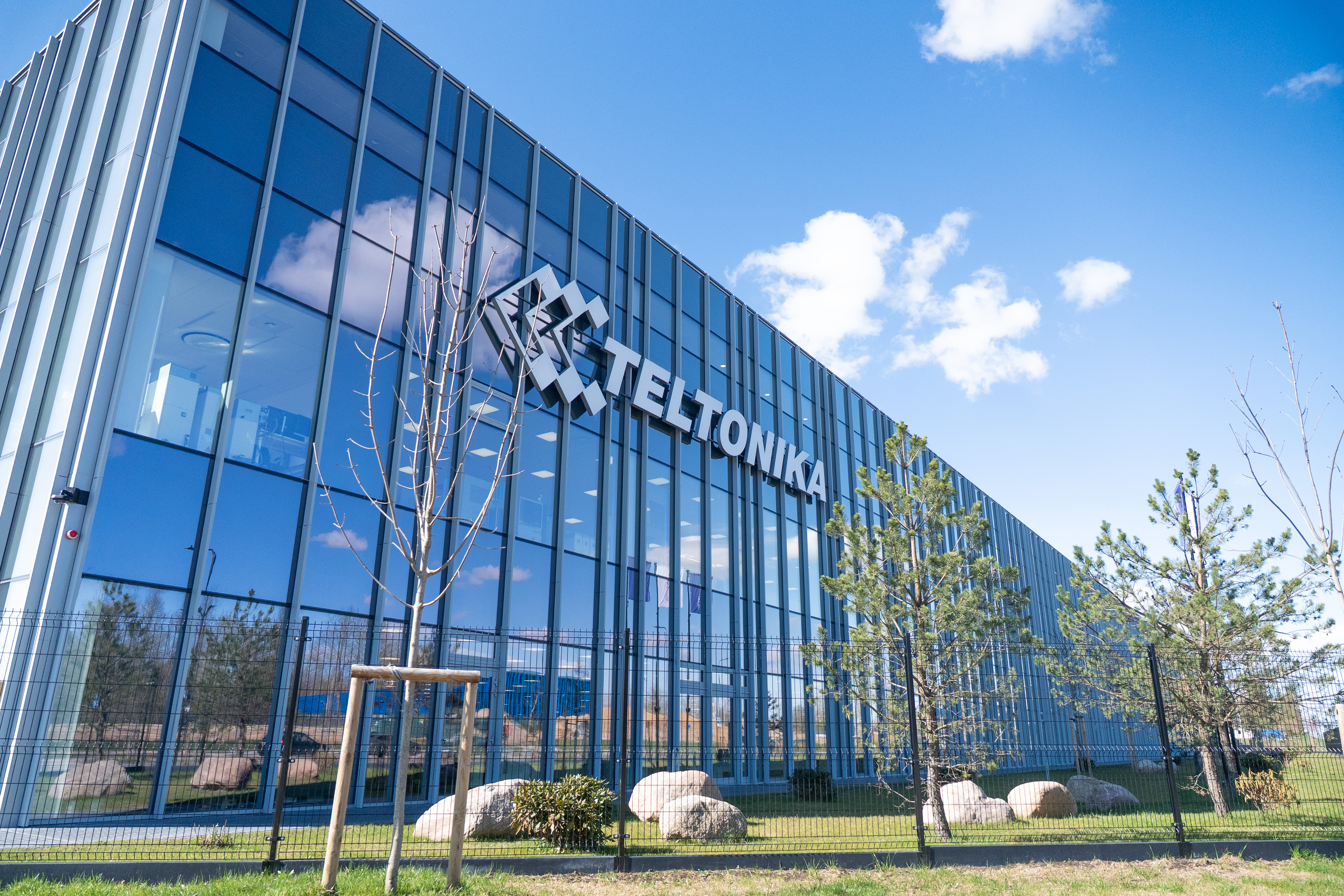
Teltonika High-Tech Hill

In 2014, Teltonika began providing electronics manufacturing services to external clients – operations that later became the Teltonika EMS subsidiary.

To support its increasingly diversified operations, Teltonika restructured into a company group with a holding entity – Teltonika IoT Group – and separately managed subsidiaries, each focused on a product niche: Teltonika Telematics, Teltonika Networks, Teltonika Telemedic, Teltonika Energy, and Teltonika EMS. Teltonika Energy was added in 2021 following the introduction of the company's first electric vehicle charging product, TeltoCharge.

=== COVID-19 period ===
During the COVID-19 pandemic, Teltonika developed what was described as Lithuania's first domestically produced artificial lung ventilator. For this contribution, founder Arvydas Paukštys was awarded the Cross of Knight of the Order for Merits to Lithuania. The group also committed to producing a medical-grade smart wristband designed to detect atrial fibrillation, developed in collaboration with Kaunas University of Technology and Vilnius University.

=== 2020–2022 ===
By the early 2020s, Teltonika had produced more than 21 million IoT devices at its Lithuanian factories.

In 2020, the company announced plans for the Teltonika High-Tech Hill technology park in Vilnius.

In October 2022, Teltonika opened a €34 million high-tech technology center in Molėtai to produce telemedicine devices and networking equipment.

In 2022, the European Investment Bank provided €50 million in funding to Teltonika IoT Group to accelerate research, development and innovation in wireless networks and communication technologies, and to support the expansion of its manufacturing facilities.

=== Taiwan semiconductor agreement (2023) ===
In 2023, Teltonika signed a €14 million technological cooperation agreement with Taiwan's Industrial Technology Research Institute (ITRI) to establish a semiconductor industry in Lithuania. It was reported at the time to be the largest ITRI cooperation agreement with any foreign entity in the institute's 50-year history.

Under the agreement, ITRI would provide Teltonika with licences for semiconductor chip manufacturing technologies and assist with engineering training, with the aim of establishing semiconductor chip design, fabrication, assembly, and testing capabilities in Lithuania. Of the €14 million total value, €10 million was provided by Taiwan's Ministry of Foreign Affairs under a bilateral cooperation plan, with the remaining €4 million contributed by Teltonika itself.

The agreement followed improving diplomatic relations between Lithuania and Taiwan after Lithuania's decision to allow Taiwan to open a representative office in Vilnius in November 2021 – a move that strained Lithuania's relations with China.

In late 2024, Teltonika suspended planned construction of its semiconductor facilities in Vilnius, citing bureaucratic delays related to land-use reclassification and infrastructure permitting. After meeting with the Lithuanian government, Paukštys indicated that completion of the semiconductor component of the High-Tech Hill project could be delayed to approximately 2032.

=== 2024–present ===
In August 2024, Paukštys transferred the management of the group to Marius Derenčius, who became CEO of Teltonika IoT Group.

In 2024, Teltonika opened an office in Dallas in the US.

Economists at Lithuanian National Radio and Television (LRT) have identified Teltonika as the primary driver of Lithuania's high-technology manufacturing expansion, accounting for roughly 41 percent of the sector's growth over the decade to 2024.

In September 2025, Teltonika opened four new factories simultaneously in the Liepkalnis district of Vilnius as part of a €320 million investment, marking the first stage of its High-Tech Hill industrial park project. The facilities comprised a printed circuit board (PCB) factory, an electronics assembly plant, a plastics and mechanical components facility, and an electronic components assembly unit.

The PCB factory, spanning more than 33,000 square metres, was noted by industry observers as the first greenfield PCB manufacturing facility built in Europe in over two decades, at a time when the European PCB industry had been contracting relative to Asian producers.

The facility is planned to employ approximately 250 specialists and incorporates manufacturing processes not previously used at scale in Europe, including digital solder mask printing and vertical continuous plating (VCP).

In September 2026, the Kuprioniškės transformer substation was opened to secure power supply for the Teltonika High-Tech Hill technology park.

== Business activities ==
=== Teltonika Telematics ===
Develops and manufactures GPS tracking and fleet management devices used in logistics, transportation, agriculture, car rental, and construction. Berg Insight ranked Teltonika as the market leader in the aftermarket vehicle telematics hardware segment, with annual sales reaching €170 million in 2024.

In 2025, Teltonika and Wialon (Gurtam) connected their one millionth vehicle worldwide.

=== Teltonika Networks ===
Manufactures industrial cellular routers, gateways, switches, and modems for deployment in Industry 4.0, smart city, energy, and telecommunications infrastructure.

In 2023, the subsidiary introduced Lithuania's first domestically developed 5G devices, including a 5G router and network gateway.

In 2024, Teltonika Networks was the second-largest cellular router and gateway provider by revenue globally, and the volume leader.

=== Teltonika Telemedic ===
Produces telemedicine and telecare devices, including the TeltoHeart smart wristband – a wearable device with six-lead ECG capability designed for remote cardiac monitoring and the detection of atrial fibrillation. The device was developed in cooperation with researchers at Kaunas University of Technology and Vilnius University, and has received medical certification within the European Union.

=== Teltonika Energy ===
Produces electric vehicle charging equipment for residential and commercial applications. All products are manufactured within the European Union.

=== Teltonika EMS (TLT Manufacturing) ===
Teltonika EMS, operating under the TLT Manufacturing brand, provides electronics manufacturing services to third-party clients across sectors including medical and automotive.

The company states that its annual production capacity rose from 10 million to 30 million electronic devices following the 2025 factory openings.

== Manufacturing ==
Teltonika operates manufacturing facilities in Vilnius and Molėtai, Lithuania. These facilities employ several hundred local workers and operate automated assembly, testing, and packaging systems.

The Vilnius operations are centred on the High-Tech Hill industrial park in the Liepkalnis district. The group follows a vertically integrated model encompassing component sourcing, PCB manufacturing, electronics assembly, plastics moulding, mechanical components, and quality control.
