= Tp-Link Deco =

Whole-home mesh Wi-Fi product line by TP-Link corporation

TP-Link Deco
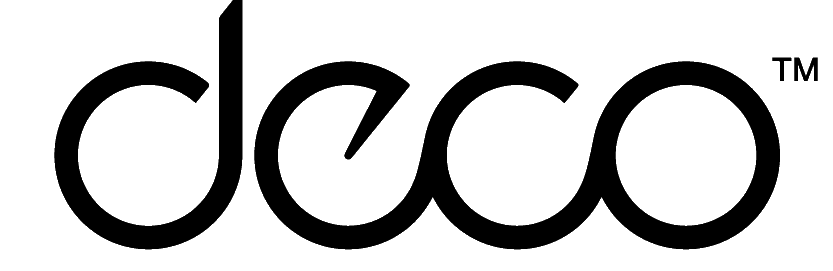

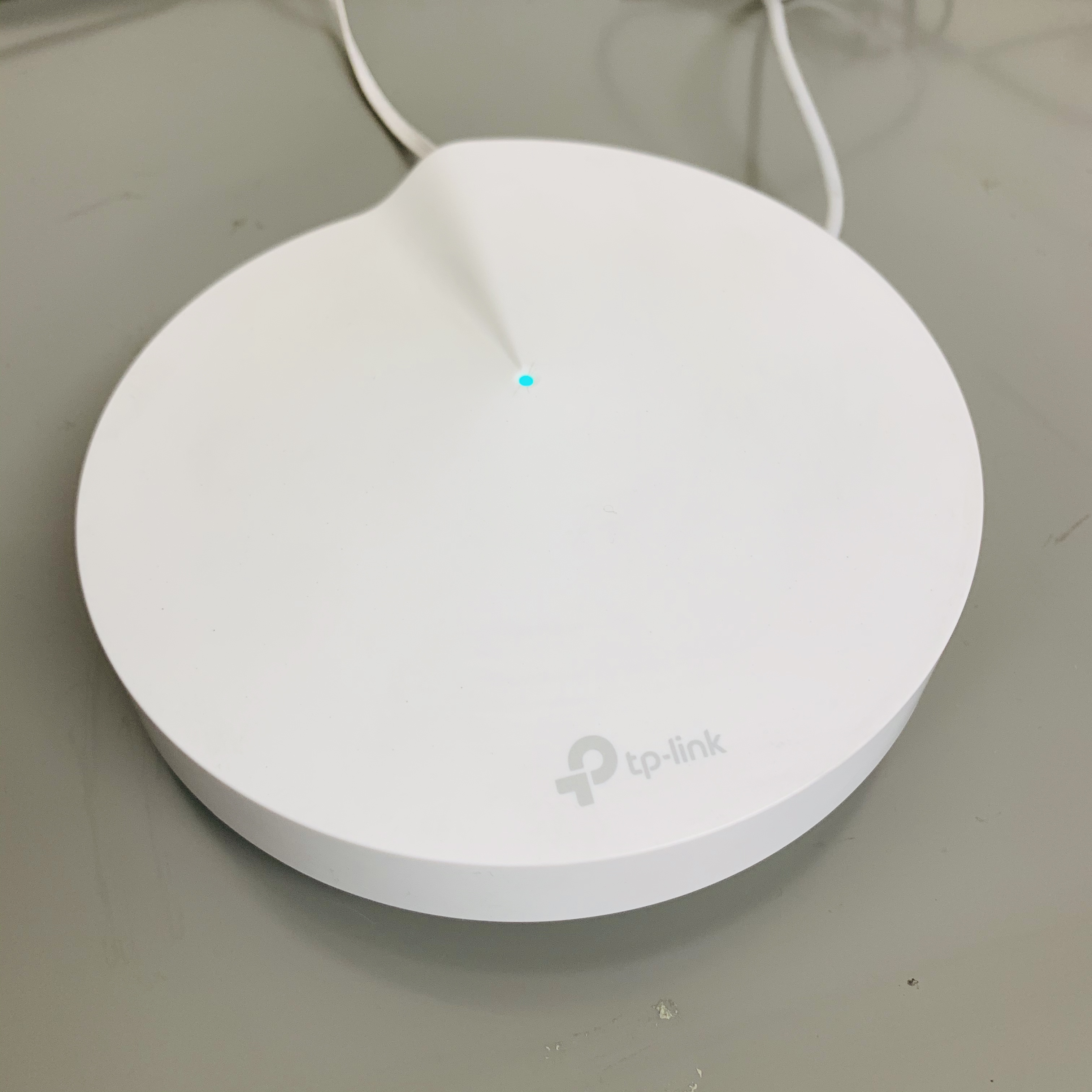
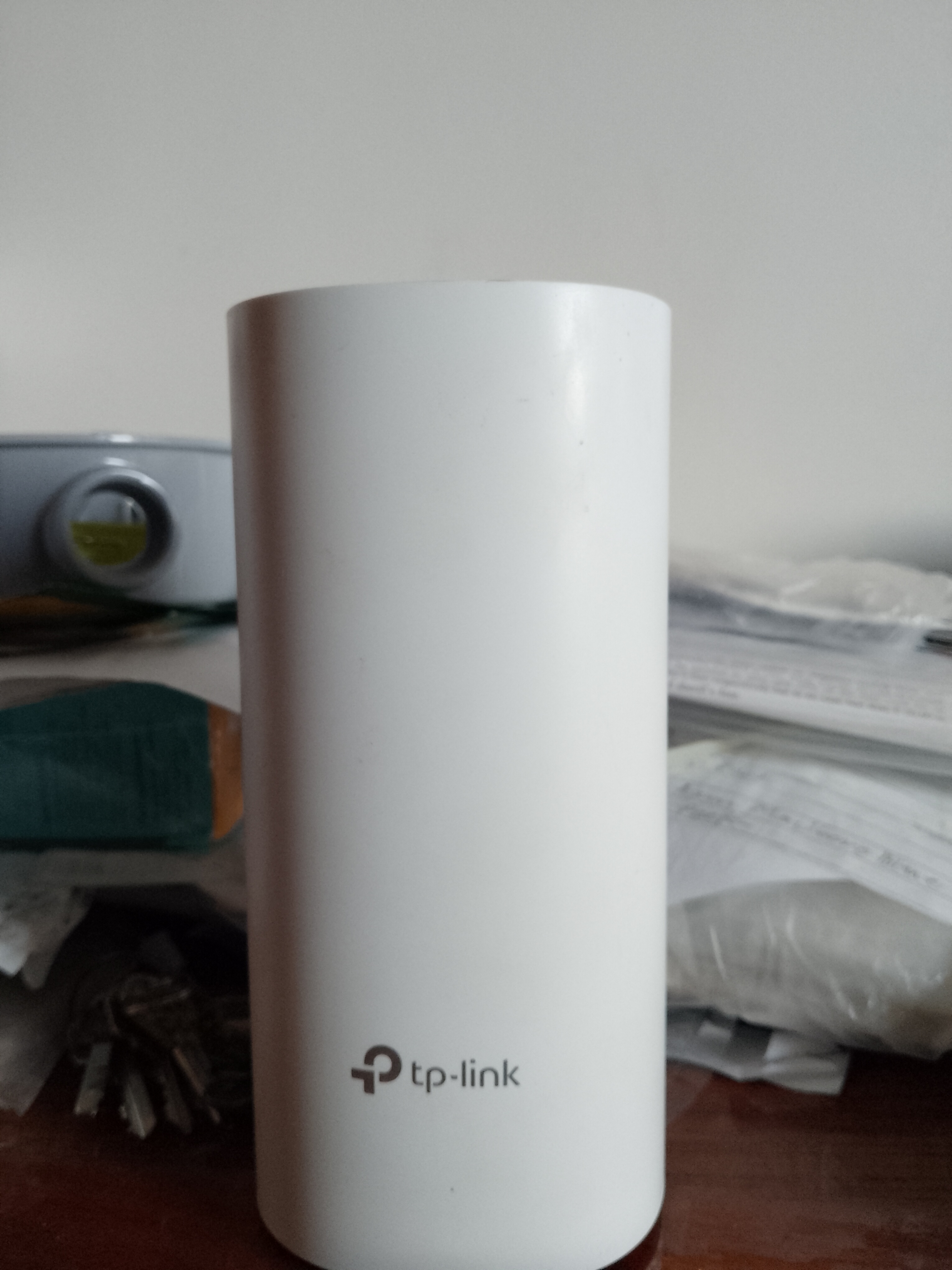
- Deco M9 Plus Deco M4R Two examples photos of Deco mesh
- Type: Whole-home mesh Wi-Fi system
- Inventor: TP-Link
- Inception: 2017
- Manufacturer: TP-Link
- Available: Yes
- Website: tp-link.com/us/deco-mesh-wifi/

TP-Link Deco is a product line of whole-home mesh Wi-Fi systems manufactured and sold by TP-Link. The line was introduced in 2017 with the Deco M5, a dual-band Wi-Fi 5 system. Subsequent generations cover Wi-Fi 6, Wi-Fi 6E, and Wi-Fi 7 technology across a range of price points. As of early 2026, TechRadar ranked the Deco BE63, the current flagship Wi-Fi 7 model, as the best overall mesh Wi-Fi system available.

TP-Link was founded in Shenzhen, China in 1996 and became one of the largest producers of consumer networking equipment globally. According to multiple reports, the company held approximately 65 percent of the U.S. home and small-business router market as of late 2024. Beginning in late 2024, TP-Link became the subject of a multi-agency U.S. government investigation over national security concerns.

== Product line overview ==
=== Wi-Fi 5 (M series) ===
The first Deco models used Wi-Fi 5 (802.11ac) technology and carried "M" model designations.

The Deco M5, introduced in 2017, was a dual-band AC1300 system delivering 400 Mbps on 2.4 GHz and 867 Mbps on 5 GHz. Each unit measured 4.7 by 1.5 inches (119 mm × 38 mm) and used a quad-core processor with 512 MB of RAM. A three-pack was priced at $300 at launch and carried claims of covering up to 5,500 square feet. Each node included two Gigabit Ethernet ports and a USB-C power connector, and used Bluetooth 4.2 for app-based initial setup. TechRadar noted in its review that the M5 was "more affordable than most of the competition" — $300 for three units versus $279 for three Google WiFi units and approximately $400 for a two-pack of Netgear Orbi — and highlighted its ease of setup, though it found that "performance tailed off quite quickly at longer distances where more obstructions were involved."

The Deco M9 Plus was a subsequent Wi-Fi 5 model priced at £300 for a two-pack in the UK. Unlike the M5, it added a third radio band and integrated Bluetooth, Zigbee, and Z-Wave radios, functioning as a smart home hub in addition to a mesh router. TechRadar described the M9 Plus as offering better performance than its predecessor while noting that "you do need to want the smart hub of the equation for the price to make sense."

=== Wi-Fi 6 (X series) ===
TP-Link introduced Wi-Fi 6 (802.11ax) Deco models under "X" designations. Wi-Fi 6 brought higher theoretical throughput, improved performance in environments with many connected devices through OFDMA, and reduced power consumption for battery-powered clients through Target Wake Time (TWT). Models in this range span entry-level dual-band configurations to high-end tri-band systems with 2.5 Gbps WAN/LAN ports and cover up to 5,500 square meters

=== Wi-Fi 6E (XE series) ===
Wi-Fi 6E extended the Wi-Fi 6 specification to the 6 GHz frequency band, adding a third band that was largely free from interference from legacy devices at the time of introduction. TP-Link branded its Wi-Fi 6E Deco units with "XE" designations.

The Deco XE75 Pro is a tri-band Wi-Fi 6E system covering up to 7,200 square feet in a three-pack configuration, retailing at approximately $600. TechRadar described it as "an excellent Wi-Fi 6E mesh system for those seeking high-speed, low-latency performance with wide coverage," and noted support for up to 200 connected devices. The review cited seamless roaming as a positive feature, while noting the absence of USB ports and the requirement of a paid subscription for some security features as drawbacks.

=== Wi-Fi 7 (BE series) ===
TP-Link introduced Wi-Fi 7 (802.11be) Deco models beginning in 2023, initially using "BE" designations. Wi-Fi 7 introduced Multi-Link Operation (MLO), which allows simultaneous transmission and reception across multiple frequency bands, and 320 MHz channel widths on the 6 GHz band.

The Deco BE63 (sold as the BE65 in most regions outside the United States) is the current flagship model. It is a tri-band Wi-Fi 7 system using 2.4 GHz, 5 GHz, and 6 GHz bands. TechRadar noted that the U.S. and international versions differ in maximum theoretical speed — 10 Gbps for the BE63 versus 9.2 Gbps for the BE65 — attributing the difference to varying national regulations affecting usable speeds per band. A single unit retails at $299.99 in the United States. Each node measures 176 mm high and 107.5 mm in diameter.

TechRadar ranked the Deco BE63 as the best overall mesh Wi-Fi system available in early 2026, describing it as offering "fast speeds and wide and dependable wireless signal" at "a decent price" relative to competing Wi-Fi 7 systems, and specifically highlighting free parental controls as a feature distinguishing it from some rivals.

== Technology ==
=== Mesh operation ===
Deco systems use multiple nodes, of which one connects to the modem or ISP gateway and acts as the primary unit. Additional nodes extend the network by relaying traffic. All nodes share a single network name (SSID) and password, so client devices connect to whichever node provides the strongest signal without requiring manual network switching.

=== Backhaul ===
The connection between nodes — the backhaul — can be either wireless or wired. On dual-band nodes, wireless backhaul shares radio capacity with client access traffic, which reduces available throughput. Tri-band nodes can dedicate one band exclusively to backhaul, improving overall network performance. Nodes that detect a wired Ethernet connection between them use it as the backhaul path in preference to wireless backhaul.

=== HomeShield ===
TP-Link offers a subscription security service called HomeShield across the Deco range. HomeShield provides parental controls, network-level threat detection, and quality-of-service (QoS) management. Some features, including basic parental controls, are available without a subscription; more detailed reports and advanced controls require HomeShield Pro, a paid tier. TechRadar noted in its Deco XE75 Pro review that "some security features require a paid subscription" as a drawback of that system.

== Reception ==
The original Deco M5 received reviews describing it as easy to set up and affordable relative to competing mesh systems at its 2017 launch price, while noting that its wireless throughput at longer ranges with obstructions was lower than more expensive alternatives such as Netgear Orbi. The current flagship, the Deco BE63, ranked first in TechRadar's best mesh Wi-Fi roundup in early 2026, with the publication citing its performance, price, and free parental controls.

== See also ==
- TP-Link
- Mesh networking
- Wi-Fi 6
- Wi-Fi 6E
- Wi-Fi 7
- Google Nest Wifi
- Eero
- Netgear Orbi
- Linksys Velop
