= ExtremeXOS =

- Developer: Extreme Networks
- OS family: Unix-like
- Working state: Current
- Source model: Closed source and partly Open source
- Initial release: version 10.1: February, 2004
- Latest release: v33.3.1.4 / 16.04.2025
- Available in: English
- Supported platforms: Extreme Networks Network switches
- Kernel type: Monolithic (Linux)
- Default user interface: Command-line interface
- Official website: www.extremenetworks.com/products/extreme-xos.aspx

ExtremeXOS is the software or the network operating system used in newer Extreme Networks network switches. It is Extreme Networks second generation operating system after the VxWorks based ExtremeWare operating system.

ExtremeXOS is based on the Linux kernel and BusyBox. In July 2008 BusyBox took legal action against Extreme Networks due to alleged violation of the GNU General Public License. Three months later the lawsuit was settled out of court.
