= Home Network Administration Protocol =

Proprietary network protocol

Home Network Administration Protocol (HNAP) is a proprietary network protocol invented by Pure Networks, Inc. and acquired by Cisco Systems which allows identification, configuration, and management of network devices. HNAP is based on SOAP.

Starting in January 2010, vulnerabilities were discovered in multiple D-Link network devices where HNAP authentication could be bypassed.

2014 HNAP is used by "The Moon" worm which infects Linksys routers.
