= Swiftair Flight 5960 =

2024 aviation accident in Lithuania

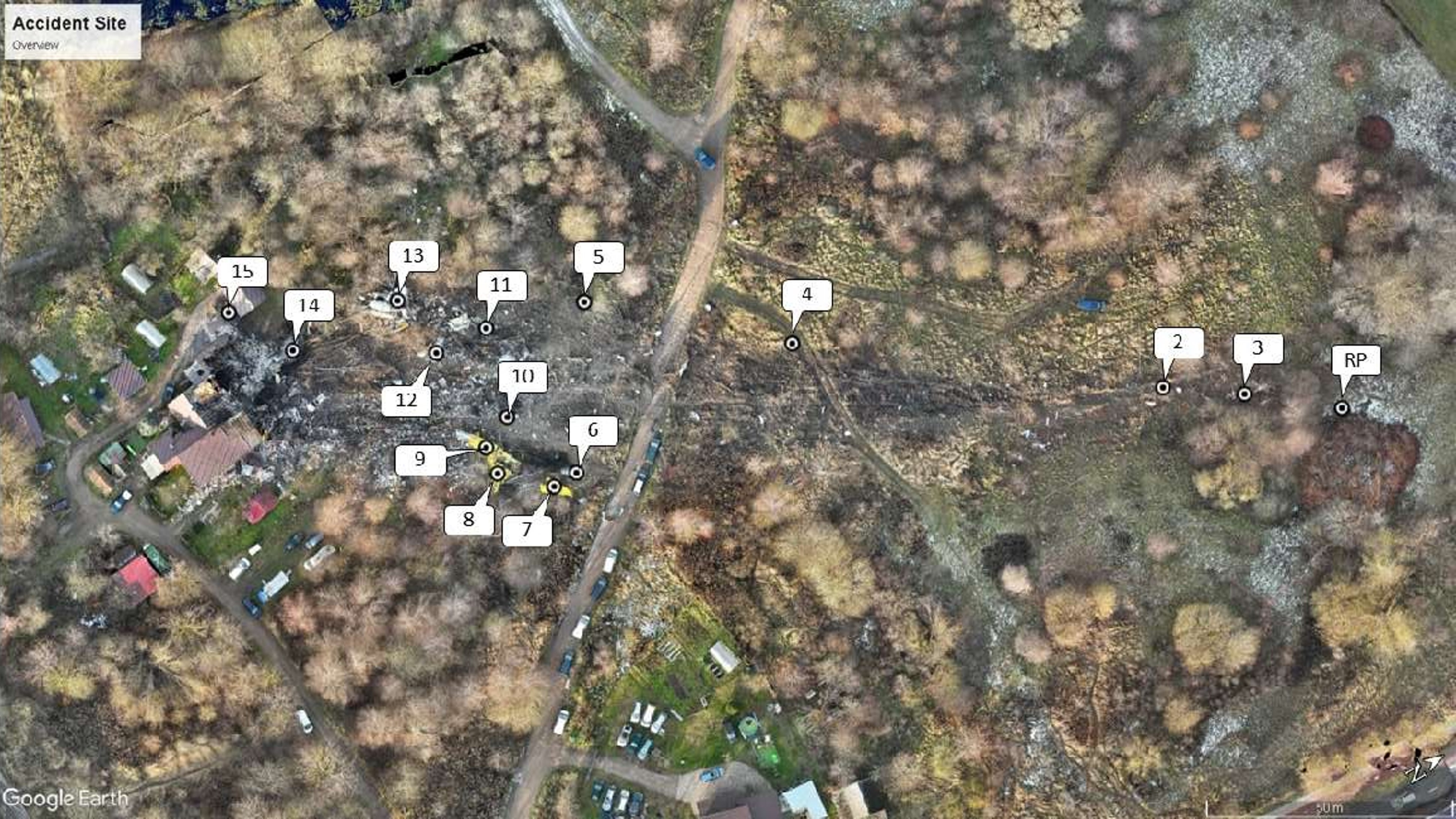
- Aerial view of the crash site

Accident
- Date: 25 November 2024
- Summary: Crashed on approach following the disabling of the hydraulic system; under investigation
- Site: Liepkalnis, near Vilnius Airport, Vilnius, Lithuania; 54°39′27.86″N 025°18′7.31″E

Aircraft
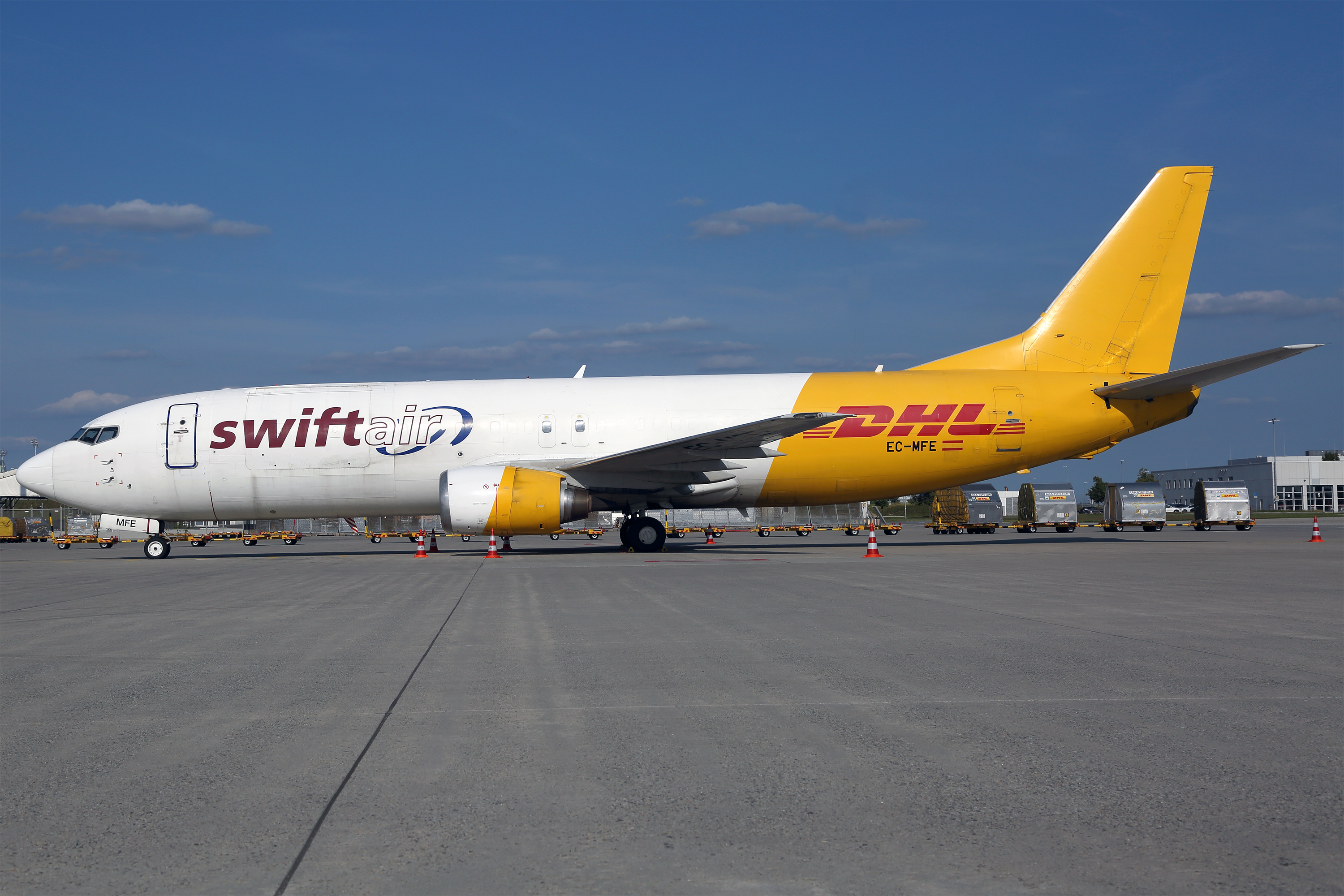
- EC-MFE, the aircraft involved in the accident, seen in July 2024
- Aircraft type: Boeing 737-476(SF) (Note: Boeing assigned a unique customer code to each of its customers from 1958 until 2016, denoted as a suffix to the model number. 76 denotes an aircraft built for Trans Australia Airlines (later known as Australian Airlines). This aircraft was a 737-400 model, hence the designation 737-476. SF stands for 'Special Freighter', referring to an aircraft originally built for passenger transport but later converted into a cargo aircraft.)
- Operator: Swiftair on behalf of European Air Transport Leipzig (DHL Aviation)
- IATA flight No.: QY5960
- ICAO flight No.: BCS18D
- Call sign: POSTMAN 18 DELTA
- Registration: EC-MFE
- Flight origin: Leipzig/Halle Airport, Leipzig, Germany
- Destination: Vilnius Airport, Vilnius, Lithuania
- Occupants: 4
- Crew: 4
- Fatalities: 1
- Injuries: 3
- Survivors: 3

Swiftair Flight 5960 (operating as European Air Transport Leipzig Flight 18D) was an international cargo flight that crashed early in the morning on 25 November 2024 while on final approach to Vilnius Airport. The aircraft, a Boeing 737-400, was flying from Leipzig/Halle Airport in Leipzig, Germany, to Vilnius Airport in Vilnius, Lithuania, when it crashed into the ground short of the runway and came to a stop near a two-story house in Liepkalnis. The captain was killed in the accident and the other three were injured. No one on the ground was injured.

== Background ==
=== Aircraft ===
The aircraft involved was a 31-year old Boeing 737-400SF registered as EC-MFE. It was powered by two CFM International CFM56-3C1 engines. It was operated by Swiftair on behalf of DHL.

=== Crew ===
The captain on board flight 5960 was a 48 year old male, with 5,432 flight hours, of which 1,298 were on the Boeing 737. He also had experience on the ATR-72. The co-pilot was a 34 year old male, with 520 flight hours, of which 190 were on the 737.

== Accident ==
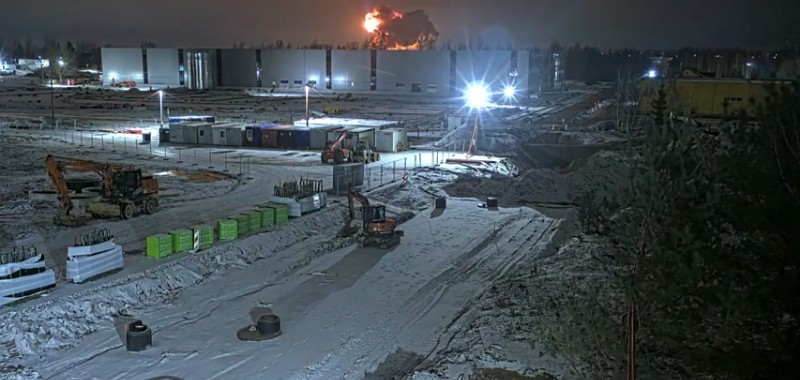
A CCTV image showing the fireball rising from the crash site of Flight 5960

The aircraft took off from the DHL hub at Leipzig Airport at 02:08 UTC (03:08 local) on 25 November with the co-pilot being the pilot flying and cruised at FL330 (33,000 ft) The accident occurred when flight 5960 was on final approach to Vilnius Airport. The flight first struck trees before sliding across a pathway and a road before striking a two-story house in the Liepkalnis neighborhood, approximately 1.3 kilometres (0.8 mi; 0.7 nmi) north of the airport at 3:28:08 UTC (5:28:08 local). The house in which the aircraft struck was partially destroyed by the impact and fire resulting from the jet fuel igniting.

All 13 occupants of the house were safely evacuated. Several roads were closed in Liepkalnis, while authorities urged people not to travel to the area. Several buildings and a car were also struck by the plane. The captain was killed in the accident, while everyone else survived.

== Aftermath ==
On 26 November, the runway of Vilnius Airport was closed between 10:00 and 11:00 as part of police efforts to film the crash site using drones, resulting in delays to four flights.

== Investigation ==
Acting Minister of National Defence Laurynas Kasčiūnas said that no signs indicating a sabotage have been identified in its preliminary stages. The Lithuanian special services briefed that there had been no indications of foul play.

This accident is being investigated by the Transport Accident and Incident Investigation Division of the Ministry of Justice of Lithuania, with assistance of investigators from Spain, Germany and the United States. The safety investigation authority of Spain sent two investigators and the Federal Ministry for Digital and Transport of Germany sent four experts from the German Federal Bureau of Aircraft Accident Investigation to Lithuania to assist in the investigation. The National Transportation Safety Board (NTSB) sent a team of US investigators from the NTSB, Boeing, and the US Federal Aviation Administration (FAA) to Lithuania to assist with the investigation. The Lithuanian Ministry of Justice also notified the International Civil Aviation Organization (ICAO), the European Union Aviation Safety Agency (EASA), the European Commission and the FAA about the accident.

A Beechcraft King Air 350 calibration and inspection aircraft of the Polish Air Navigation Service was also employed to check the guidance and navigational systems of Vilnius airport after the crash. Both flight recorders (CVR and FDR) were found on the same day at around 11:30. Lithuanian authorities announced that an inspection of the crash site will be held in the next two to three days, and that after it the wreckage of the plane will be removed. Due to the lack of a suitable laboratory in Lithuania, the flight recorders were to be sent to Germany for analysis. Lithuanian president Gitanas Nausėda also visited the crash site. On 29 November, the wreckage of the plane and its cargo were removed from the crash site and taken to a hangar, where they will be analysed during the investigation.

On 20 December, the Lithuanian justice ministry, citing police investigations and analysis of the flight recorders, announced that it had found no "unlawful interference" in the crash.

On 26 March 2025, the Prosecutor General's Office of Lithuania, citing pretrial investigations, stated that a human error was the likely cause of the crash, adding that the hydraulic systems responsible for deploying the aircraft's flaps were disabled. Lithuanian prosecutors also asked the Spanish authorities to serve a notice of suspicion to the pilot, who was by then being treated in Spain.

On 31 March 2025, the Transport Accident and Incident Investigation Division released an interim report. The report stated that the flaps were in the retracted position and that the flight crew had switched to the wrong air traffic control frequency before the crash.

On 18 November 2025, the Transport Accident and Incident Investigation Division released an interim statement. It stated that "approaching the anniversary of the accident, the investigation still continues due to the complexity of the accident. The final report is expected to be prepared over the course of the next few months."

== Reactions ==
On 25 November, Germany's foreign minister Annalena Baerbock stressed that authorities in Germany and Lithuania were currently examining all possibilities. Baerbock did not raise any direct accusations against individuals or states.

The media connected the accident to an arson attack on a DHL flight from Leipzig in July 2024.
