= Exinda =

American networking hardware company

Exinda Inc.
- Type: Private company
- Industry: Networking hardware
- Founded: 2002; 24 years ago
- Defunct: 2017; 9 years ago
- Fate: Acquired by GFI Software
- Headquarters: Boston, Massachusetts, United States
- Website: www.exinda.com

Exinda is a company that provides computer networking hardware for improving the performance of wide area networks (WANs), known as WAN optimization.

In 2017, the company was acquired by GFI Software.

== Services ==
As of 2008, Exinda provided wide area network (WAN) bandwidth management products to small and medium-sized enterprises. The Exinda WAN optimization appliance provided network management functions covering network optimization, application visibility, traffic control and application acceleration. Policy-based throttling and packet compression prioritized bandwidth usage and controlled peer-to-peer (P2P) and recreational internet traffic. Exinda provided its products through commercial value-added resellers (VARs).

== History ==
The company was originally formed in Melbourne, Australia, by Con Nikolouzakis, Chris Siakos and Anthony Bodin in 2002 as Exinda Networks. Its technology was based on research at the Royal Melbourne Institute of Technology.

OpenView Venture Partners of Boston, Massachusetts, invested $6 million (US) in the company in 2007. Nikolouzakis was chief executive at the time, and expected to add a Boston sales office to focus on the US market. Previously sales were reported to be mostly in Europe and Asia. In October 2007, the company announced a $1.1 million contract with the government of Malaysia. In August 2008 Michael Sharma (previously of PlateSpin) became CEO and Nikolouzakis was named chief product officer.

By 2010, the company reported being based in Toronto, but keeping its official headquarters in the US. In addition to Exinda's presence in Canada, it also maintained small sales offices in a handful of other countries. In March 2012, another $12 million investment round included investor Greenspring Associates. The city of Richmond, California used Exinda products to filter out video traffic from sites such as YouTube.

In November 2014, Exinda released updates to its Network Orchestrator product. The updates included integrated captive portal policies, adaptive response quotas, and HTTP caching.
