= Billion Electric =

Electronics company of Taiwan

Billion Electric Co., Ltd.
- Company type: Public
- Traded as: TWSE: 3027
- Industry: Manufacturing
- Founded: 27 March 1973; 53 years ago
- Headquarters: Xindian District, New Taipei City, Taiwan
- Area served: Worldwide
- Key people: Tim Chen, (Chairman & CEO)
- Products: Power supply, LED Driver, Gateway (telecommunications), Router
- Owner: Tim Chen
- Number of employees: 501-1,000
- Subsidiaries: EGB Electronics (Dongguan) Co. Limited; Billion Mark (Nanjing) Co. Limited; BEC Technologies Inc. Billion Watts Technologies; Billion Sun Power Technologies
- Website: Billion Electric Co., Ltd.

Billion Electric Co. Ltd. (Taiex: #3027), based in Taiwan, is an electronics company founded in 1973.

Their range of ADSL modem/routers were introduced into Australia in 2002. Since then, features have been added including 4 port switches, wireless, VoIP, and VPN termination.

== See also ==
- List of companies of Taiwan
- List of networking hardware vendors
