= Extreme Networks =

American networking company

Extreme Networks, Inc.
- Type: Public
- Traded as: Nasdaq: EXTR; S&P 600 component
- Industry: Networking hardware
- Founded: 1996; 30 years ago
- Founders: Stephen Haddock; Herb Schneider; Gordon Stitt
- Headquarters: Morrisville, North Carolina, United States
- Key people: Ed Meyercord (president & CEO); Nabil Bukhari (CTO and CPO) Norman Rice (COO)
- Products: ExtremeCloud IQ; ExtremeXOS; ExtremeWireless; ExtremeSwitching; Extreme Fabric Connect; ExtremeAnalytics; ExtremeRouting
- Revenue: ▲US$1.31 billion (2023)
- Operating income: ▲US$108 million (2023)
- Net income: ▲US$78 million (2023)
- Total assets: ▲US$1.14 billion (2023)
- Total equity: ▲US$117 million (2023)
- Number of employees: 2,849 (2023)
- Website: extremenetworks.com

Extreme Networks, Inc. is an American networking company based in Morrisville, North Carolina. Extreme Networks designs, develops, and manufactures wired and wireless network infrastructure equipment and develops the software for network management, policy, analytics, security and access controls.

== History ==
Former logo of Extreme Networks

Extreme Networks was established by co-founders Gordon Stitt, Herb Schneider, and Stephen Haddock in 1996 in California, United States, with its first offices located in Cupertino, which later moved to Santa Clara, and later to San Jose. Early investors included Norwest Venture Partners, AVI Capital Management, Trinity Ventures, and Kleiner Perkins Caufield & Byers. Gordon Stitt was a co-founder and was chief executive officer until August 2006, when he retired and became chairman of the board of directors.

The initial public offering in April 1999 was listed on the NASDAQ stock exchange as ticker "EXTR."

In April 2013, Charles W. Berger (from ParAccel as it was acquired by Actian) replaced Oscar Rodriguez as CEO.

On April 19, 2015, Charles W. Berger resigned as CEO, and was replaced by Board Chairman Ed Meyercord.

== Acquisitions ==
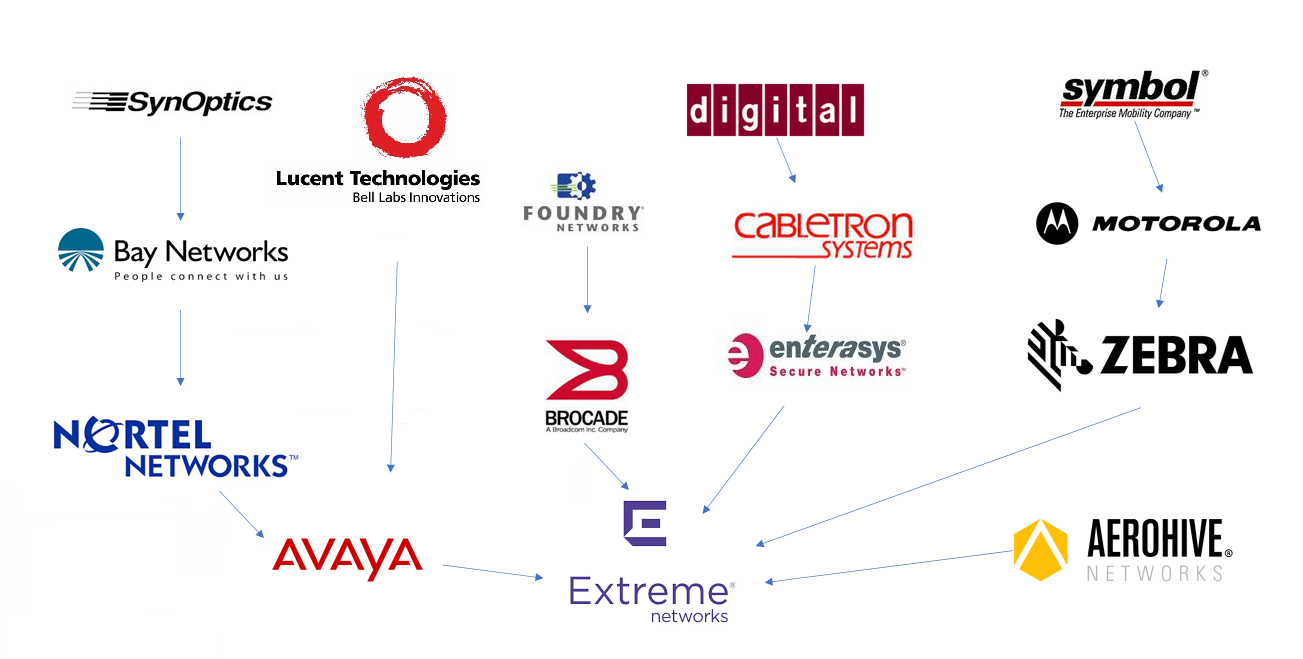
Main network brand acquisitions (as of 2019)

In October 1996, Extreme Networks acquired Mammoth Technology.

Extreme Networks acquired Optranet in February 2001 and Webstacks in March 2001. Extreme had invested in both companies, which were purchased for about $73 million and $74 million respectively.

On September 12, 2013, Extreme Networks announced it would acquire Enterasys Networks for about $180 million.

On October 31, 2016, Extreme Networks announced that it completed the acquisition of Zebra Technologies' wireless LAN business for about $55 million.

On March 7, 2017, Extreme Networks announced its intention to acquire Avaya's networking business in a transaction valued at $100 million. The acquisition officially closed on July 17, 2017. As part of this transaction, Extreme acquired customers, personnel, and technology assets from Avaya. Extreme has publicly stated that it expects to "generate over $200 million in additional annualized revenue" from the acquired networking assets from Avaya.

On March 29, 2017, Extreme Networks announced its intention to acquire Brocade's SRA (Switching, Routing, and Analytics) business from Broadcom for an undisclosed sum. The acquisition officially closed on October 30, 2017, and with it, Extreme acquires customer relationships, personnel, and technology assets from Brocade including the SLX, VDX, MLX, CES, CER, Workflow Composer, Automation Suites, and certain other Data Center related products. Extreme has publicly stated that it anticipates "the transaction will generate over $230 million in additional annualized revenue from the acquired assets".

On June 26, 2019, Extreme Networks announced its intention to acquire Aerohive Networks for $272 million. Aerohive's cloud-managed portfolio of wireless, LAN, and SD-WAN products is well-regarded in the industry. The acquisition was completed on August 9, 2019, at an aggregate purchase price of approximately $272 million.

On September 15, 2021, Extreme Networks acquired Infovista's Ipanema SD-WAN business.

== See also ==
- List of networking hardware vendors
- Ethernet Automatic Protection Switching (EAPS)
- ExtremeXOS
