= Aerohive Networks =

Manufacturer of networking equipment

Aerohive Networks, Inc.
- Type: Public
- Traded as: NYSE: HIVE; Russell 2000 Index component
- Industry: information technology
- Founded: 2006; 20 years ago
- Founder: Changming Liu
- Defunct: 2019
- Headquarters: Milpitas, California, U.S.
- Key people: David Flynn (CEO)
- Products: Cloud-Managed Networking, AI and ML powered management, Wi-Fi access points, switches, branch routers, and application services
- Revenue: ▲US$169.8 million (2016)
- Number of employees: 460 (2018)
- Website: aerohive.com

Aerohive Networks, Inc. was an American multinational computer networking equipment company headquartered in Milpitas, California, with 17 additional offices worldwide. The company was founded in 2006 and provided wireless networking to medium-sized and larger businesses.

In 2012, Aerohive was listed on The Wall Street Journal's list of "Top 50 Start-Ups". The company raised around $105 million in venture capital funding before undergoing an IPO in March 2014.

On June 26, 2019, Extreme Networks announced its intent to acquire Aerohive for a purchase price of approximately $272 million. The acquisition closed on August 9, 2019.

== History ==
Aerohive was founded in 2006 by Changming Liu. That same year, the company raised $4 million in series A round funding. In July 2007, the company raised an additional $20 million in series B round funding led by Kleiner Perkins Caufield & Byers. Aerohive completed a series C round of funding, raising $23.5 million to expand its sales and marketing strategy in March 2010. In 2011, the company acquired Pareto Networks, a cloud-based routing service, the acquisition allowed Aerohive to integrate Pareto's cloud management technology into its existing offerings. In September 2012, Aerohive raised $22.5 million in a series E round of funding and announced its plans to undergo an IPO the following year. The company raised an additional $10 million in funding as it prepared to go public, in 2013. On March 28, 2014, the company was listed on the New York Stock Exchange under the HIVE symbol. Aerohive joined Barack Obama's ConnectED initiative in October 2014, when it partnered with Apple Inc. and provided wireless connectivity to the schools receiving Apple products.

Aerohive announced that its devices would operate more seamlessly with Barracuda Networks security products in May 2015. In September 2015, the company announced a technology alliance with Juniper Networks. In January 2016, the company released HiveSchool, a learning application for K-12 classrooms that runs on any network with any computer running the Google Chrome web browser. The company announced that it had entered a distribution agreement with Synnex Corporation in February 2016. The agreement named Synnex as the exclusive distributor of Aerohive products in Canada. In April 2016, Aerohive announced a strategic partnership with the technology company Dell.

In September 2016, the company released SD-LAN, a software-defined network that functions on local area networks. And then in August 2018, the company shipped the first family of enterprise-class 802.11ax access points (Wi-Fi 6), along with the first enterprise-class pluggable wireless access point (ATOM AP630).

On June 26, 2019 Extreme Networks was reported to take over Aerohive Networks. The acquisition was completed on August 9, 2019, at an aggregate purchase price of approximately $272 million. Accounting for Aerohive's net cash balance of $62 million at the end of its fiscal first quarter, the deal is equivalent to an enterprise value of $210 million.

== See also ==
- List of networking hardware vendors
