= DrayTek =

Taiwanese computer networking company

DrayTek Corporation
- Type: Network Equipment Manufacturer
- Industry: Network Equipment
- Founded: 1997; 29 years ago
- Headquarters: Hsinchu, Taiwan
- Key people: Calvin Ma (Founder & CEO)
- Products: Customer-premises equipment
- Number of employees: 200+
- Website: www.draytek.com

DrayTek Corporation (Chinese: 居易科技; pinyin: Jūyì Kējì) is a network equipment manufacturer of customer-premises equipment including firewalls, VPN devices, routers, managed switches and wireless LAN devices.

== History ==
The company was founded in 1997. The earliest products included ISDN based solutions, the first being the ISDN Vigor128, a USB terminal adaptor for Windows and Mac OS. This was followed by the ISDN Vigor204 ISDN terminal adaptor/PBX and the Vigor2000, its first router. The head office is located in Hsinchu, Taiwan with regional offices and distributors worldwide.

DrayTek's products cover a range of solutions such as firewall, VPN, VoIP, xDSL/broadband devices, and management software to meet the market trend.

DrayTek was one of the first manufacturers to bring VPN technology to low cost routers, increasing the viability of remote work. In 2004, DrayTek released the first of its VoIP (Voice-Over-IP) products. In 2006, new products for companies debuted, including larger scale firewalls and Unified Threat Management (UTM) firewalls products however the UTM Firewalls did not sell in sufficient volume and the UTM products ceased development and production.

== Products ==
DrayTek's product line offers business and consumer DSL modems with support for the PPPoA standard compared to the more widely supported PPPoE for use with full-featured home routers and home computers without more expensive ATM hardware. PPPoA is used primarily in the UK for ADSL lines. Most Vigor routers provide a virtual private network (VPN) feature, provides LAN-to-LAN and Remote-Dial-In Connections. In 2011, DrayTek embedded SSL VPN facilities into VigorRouter Series.

DrayTek's Initial Public Offering (IPO) on the Taiwan Stock Exchange occurred in 2004.

March 2021 DrayTek released new WiFi 6 Access Point to market - DrayTek AP1060C

August 2021 DrayTek announced 2 new WiFi 6 Routers - DrayTek Vigor 2927ax & DrayTek Vigor 2865ax

June 2024 DrayTek launched 10G Security VPN Router with Suricata support - DrayTek Vigor3912S

January 2025 DrayTek release DrayTek Vigor 2136ax WiFi 6 2.5GB WAN FTTP Broadband VPN Router

== Security ==
Networking products from DrayTek contained severe security vulnerabilities in recent years but had been fixed quickly by DrayTek, which no longer exists in DrayTek new routers.
