= Rasos (district) =

- Eldership

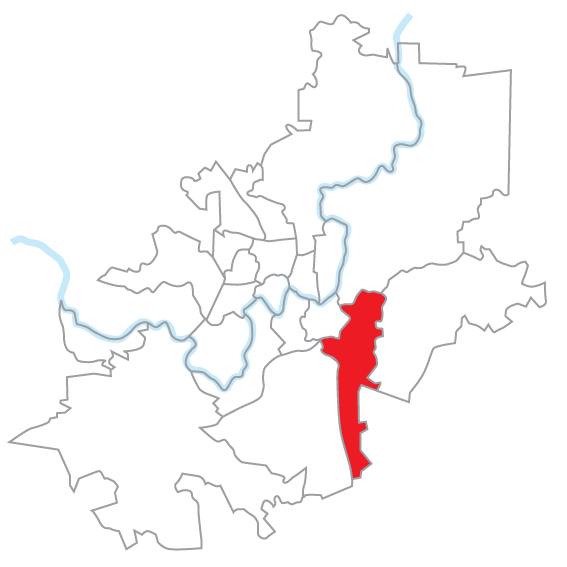
- Location in Vilnius

- Location within Lithuania
- Country: Lithuania
- County: Vilnius County
- Municipality: Vilnius City Municipality

Area
  - Total: 16.3 km^{2} (6.3 sq mi)

Population (2021)
  - Total: 12,354
  - Density: 758/km^{2} (1,960/sq mi)
- Time zone: UTC+2 (EET)
  - Summer (DST): UTC+3 (EEST)

Rasos is an eldership in the Vilnius City Municipality, Lithuania. It occupies 16.3 km². According to the 2011 census, it has a population of 10,597.

== Sports ==
=== Liepkalnis area ===
- Liepkalnis Winter Sports Centre
- LFF Stadium
