= PSSC Labs =

American supercomputing solution company

- Type: Private
- Industry: high-performance computing
- Founded: California, United States (1984)
- Founder: Larry Lesser
- Headquarters: Lake Forest, California, United States
- Area served: Worldwide
- Key people: Janice Lesser (CEO)
- Products: Computing clouds, supercomputers, big data storage servers
- Website: www.pssclabs.com

PSSC Labs is an American company based in Lake Forest, California, that develops high-performance computing hardware. Its servers, clusters, and workstations are used for scientific research and government applications. The company has implemented clustering software from NASA Goddard's Beowulf project in its supercomputers designed for bioinformatics, medical imaging, and computational chemistry.

== History ==
PSSC Labs was founded in 1984 by Larry Lesser. In 1998, it manufactured the Aeneas Supercomputer for Dr. Herbert Hamber of the University of California, Irvine (the physics and astronomy department); it was based on Linux and had a maximum speed of 20.1 Gigaflops.

In 2005, PSSC Labs demonstrated its new water-cooling technology for high-performance computers at the ACM/IEEE Supercomputing Conference in Seattle, Washington.

In 2007 the company announced products targeting life-science research: full-genome data analysis, including assembly, read mapping, and analysis of large amounts of high-throughput DNA and RNA sequencing data.

In 2008 PSSC Labs designed the Powerserve Quattro I/A 4000 supercomputer for genome sequencing.
