= Eero =

Eero may refer to:

- Eero (name), Estonian and Finnish masculine given name
- Eero (wireless networking brand), developed by Eero LLC
