= TRENDnet =

Computer networking company

TRENDnet, Inc.
- Logo as of 2018
- Type: Private
- Industry: Networking equipment
- Founded: 1990; 36 years ago
- Founder: Pei Huang; Peggy Huang
- Headquarters: Torrance, California, United States
- Area served: Worldwide
- Key people: Pei Huang (CEO)
- Products: Ethernet hubs, Routers, DSL/Cable Gateways, Switches, Wireless access points, and security IP cameras
- Website: trendnet.com

TRENDnet is a global manufacturer of computer networking products headquartered in Torrance, California, in the United States. It sells networking and surveillance products especially in the small to medium business (SMB) and home user market segments.

== History ==
The company was founded in 1990 by Pei Huang and Peggy Huang.

== Vulnerabilities ==
In September 2013, the Federal Trade Commission (FTC) brought an enforcement action against TRENDnet alleging that the company marketed its SecurView IP cameras describing them as "secure", when in fact the software allowed online viewing by anyone with the camera's IP address. The FTC approved a final settlement with TRENDnet in February 2014.
