= TP-Link =

Chinese technology company

- Logo since 2016

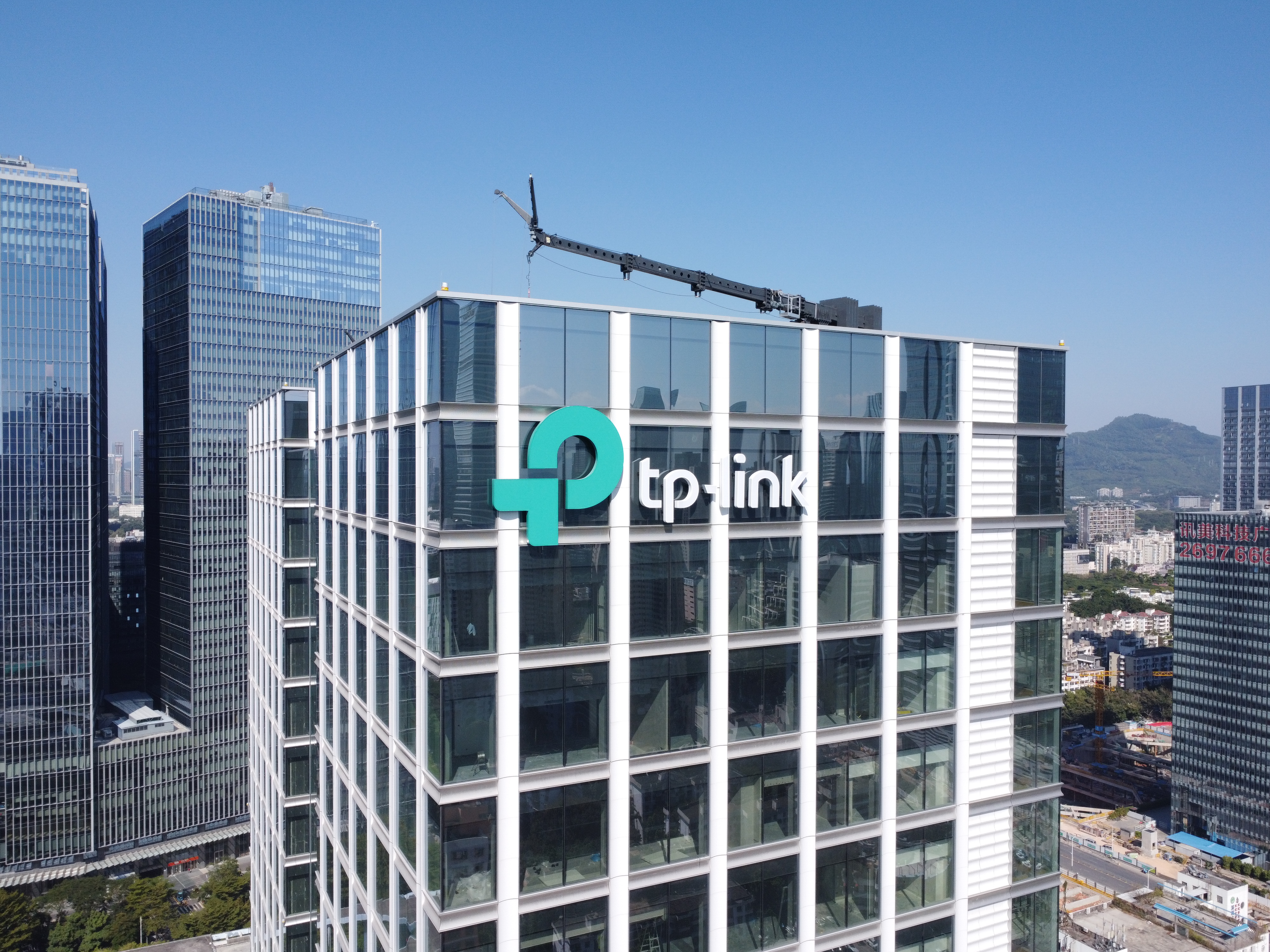
- Native name: 联洲国际技术有限公司
- Type: Private
- Industry: Networking hardware, Telecoms equipment, IP cameras
- Founded: 1996; 30 years ago
- Founder: Zhao Jianjun; Zhao Jiaxing
- Headquarters: Nanshan, Shenzhen (domestic operations); Irvine, California (international operations)
- Area served: Worldwide
- Products: Routers; DSL/cable gateways; Cable modems; Wireless adapter; Home automation devices; Switches; Wireless access points; Wireless repeaters; Mobile hotspots; Network attached storage; IP surveillance cameras
- Brands: TP-Link; Deco; Omada; VIGI; Aginet; Tapo; Kasa Smart; Mercusys
- Website: www.tp-link.com

TP-Link is a Chinese technology company that manufactures network equipment and smart home products. The company was established in 1996 in Shenzhen. It has subsidiaries operating globally and owns several brands, including Deco, Tapo, Omada, Omada Pro, VIGI, Aginet, Kasa Smart, and Mercusys.

The company has been investigated by the governments of India and the United States, citing national security risks.

== Products ==
TP-Link manufactures its products in-house, as opposed to outsourcing to original design manufacturers (ODMs). TP-Link products include high speed cable modems, mobile phones, ADSL, range extenders, routers, switches, IP cameras, power-line adapters, print servers, media converters, wireless adapters, power banks, USB hubs, smart home devices, and home robots. TP-Link also manufactured the OnHub router for Google. TP-Link manufactures smart home devices under their Kasa Smart and Tapo product lines. The company also participates in several research and development projects with the Chinese government.

== History ==
Original TP-Link logo from 1996 to 2016

TP-Link was founded in 1996 by two brothers, Zhao Jianjun (赵建军 Zhào Jiànjūn) and Zhao Jiaxing (赵佳兴 Zhào Jiāxīng). Zhao Jianjun runs the company's international operations. The company name was based on the concept of "twisted pair link" invented by Alexander Graham Bell, a kind of cabling that reduces electromagnetic interference.

TP-Link began its first international expansion in 2005. In 2007, the company moved into a new 100,000-square-meter headquarters and facilities at Shenzhen's Hi-Tech Industry Park. TP-Link USA was established in 2008. In 2022, TP-Link Corporation began to separate from TP-LINK Technologies Co., Ltd. in China.

In May 2024, TP-Link announced the completion of corporate restructuring, with newer global headquarters in the United States and Singapore. In October 2024, TP-Link announced a single California headquarters.

=== Disputes ===
In a 2023 patent dispute lawsuit in Texas, a United States federal judge rejected the company's argument that there was no link between its United States and China businesses.

In November 2025, TP-Link filed a lawsuit in Delaware federal court claiming that Netgear orchestrated a smear by planting false claims with journalists and internet influencers with the goal of scaring off customers. They claimed that Netgear's action violated a 2024 settlement of a patent fight. That accord, in which TP-Link agreed to pay Netgear $135 million, includes a provision that the public company promises not to disparage its rival.

=== National security concerns ===
==== India ====
In May 2024, the government of India issued a warning saying that TP-Link TP-Link Archer C5400X routers with versions prior to C5400X(EU)_V1_1.1.7 Build 20240510 present a security risk and that they should be updated to correct this flaw.

==== United States ====
In August 2024, the United States House Select Committee on Strategic Competition between the United States and the Chinese Communist Party asked the United States Department of Commerce to investigate TP-Link and its affiliates for potential national security risks. The U.S. Departments of Justice (DOJ), Commerce, and Defense opened investigations into the company, with the DOJ probing whether TP-Link sells its routers below cost. A spokesperson from TP-Link's United States subsidiary responded via The Wall Street Journal that they are welcome to engage with the government of the United States to demonstrate the security of their products, and the commitment to address national security risks. The majority of its employees, including those in research and development, are located in China.

In 2024, TP-Link separated its international and domestic operations in response to increased U.S. government scrutiny.

In December 2025, the Federal Trade Commission announced an investigation into TP-Link for deceiving consumers by allegedly concealing its connections to China. In January 2026, Texas governor Greg Abbott prohibited TP-Link products on all government devices and networks. In February 2026, a proposed federal ban on TP-Link products was paused in anticipation of a summit between US President Donald Trump and CCP general secretary Xi Jinping. In February 2026, Texas attorney general Ken Paxton filed a lawsuit against TP-Link, alleging deceptive marketing and backdoor access to its products for the Chinese government. In March 2026, the Federal Communications Commission banned the importation of all new foreign-made router models. In June 2026, the US Department of Defense added the company to a list of Chinese military-linked companies. In October 2026, four U.S. states sued TP-Link, citing security concerns.
