= Liepkalnis Winter Sports Centre =

Ski resort in Vilnius, Lithuania

Liepkalnis

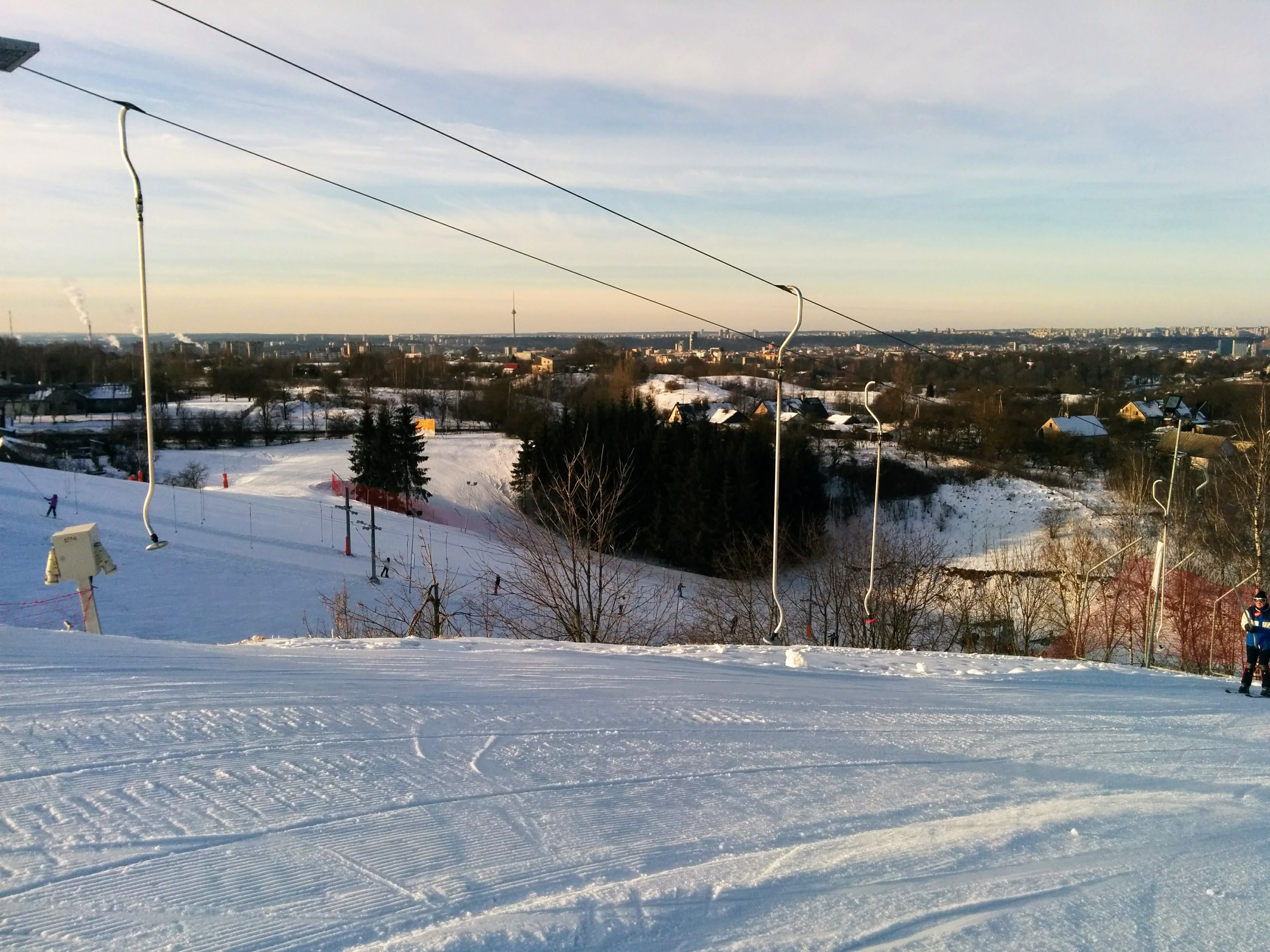
- Interactive map of Liepkalnis
- Location: Laimio kalnas
- Nearest city: Vilnius, Lithuania
- Coordinates: 54.65575°N 25.30687°E
- Vertical: 65 m (213 ft)
- Top elevation: 235.12 m (771.4 ft)
- Trails: 8
- Longest run: 400 m (1,300 ft)
- Lift system: 10 surface
- Lift capacity: 7000 passengers/hour
- Terrain parks: 1
- Snowmaking: yes
- Night skiing: yes
- Website: liepkalnis.lt

Liepkalnis Winter Sports Centre is an alpine skiing area in Vilnius, Lithuania. It has 10 lifts and 9 groomed ski runs. All the pistes are lit and equipped with artificial snow making equipment. The centre is based on the highest point in Vilnius, Laimio kalnas, with a maximum altitude of 235.12 metres (771.4 ft) above sea level. The maximum altitude difference on the hill is 65 metres (213 ft).

== History ==
The hill has been used by the alpine skiing enthusiasts since at least 1982, and it has been continually raised by piling rubble until 2000, mostly by efforts of the skiing enthusiast Laimis Janutėnas. Eventually people started calling the mountain by his name, and in 2004 the Vilnius City Municipality officially named the hill Laimio kalnas. The first ski lift was launched in 1984.

In 2013, the control of the ski area was given to the Lithuanian-Latvian JSC UAB "Trade State", which invested around 1 million euros into lighting, snowmaking, snow grooming equipment and built multiple new lifts. Along with the lifts and snow grooming infrastructure, the company operates a ski school and a ski and snowboard rental service.
