= Fabric Connect =

Cloud computing architecture

Fabric Connect, in computer networking usage, is the name used by Extreme Networks to market an extended implementation of the IEEE 802.1aq and IEEE 802.1ah-2008 standards.

The Fabric Connect technology was originally developed by the Enterprise Solutions R&D department within Nortel Networks. In 2009, Avaya, Inc acquired Nortel Networks Enterprise Business Solutions; this transaction included the Fabric Connect intellectual property together with all of the Ethernet Switching platforms that supported it. Subsequently, the Fabric Connect technology became part of the Extreme Networks portfolio by virtue of their 2017 purchase of the Avaya Networking business and assets. It was during the Avaya era that this technology was promoted as the lead element of the Virtual Enterprise Network Architecture (VENA).

== Technologies ==
=== Fabric Connect ===
Fabric Connect's provides network-wide, end-to-end, multi-layer virtualization. A network virtualization capability, based on an enhanced implementation of the IEEE 802.1aq Shortest Path Bridging (SPB) standard, Fabric Connect offers the ability to create a simplified network that can dynamically virtualize elements to efficiently provision and utilize resources, thus reducing the strain on the network and personnel. Extreme Networks base the Fabric Connect technology on the SPB standard, including support for RFC 6329, and have integrated IP Routing and IP Multicast support; this unified technology allows for the replacement of multiple conventional protocols such as Spanning Tree, RIP and/or OSPF, ECMP, and PIM.

=== Fabric Attach ===
An adjunct to the Fabric Connect technology, Fabric Attach allows network operators to extend network virtualization directly into conventional wiring closets (using existing non-Fabric Ethernet switches) and automate the provisioning of devices to their appropriate virtual network. This is particularly relevant for the mass of unattended network end-point that are now appearing, such as IP Phones, Wireless Access Points, and IP Cameras. Fabric Attach standardized protocols such as 802.1AB LLDP to exchange credentials and obtain provisioning information that allows "Client" Switches to be automatically re-configured on the fly with parameters that let Traffic Flows Map through to Fabric Connect Edge Switches (aka "Backbone Edge Bridge" in SPB definition) functioning as a Fabric Attach "Server" Switch. This method is described by an IETF "Internet Draft", pending further standardization activity. Fabric Attach is typically used to automate Wiring Closet connectivity, but has the potential to be extensible for use in the Data Center, with Virtual Machines being able to dynamically request VLAN/VSN (Virtual Service Network) assignment based upon application requirements.

== Hardware products ==
=== Virtual Services Platform 9000 Series ===
A range of modular chassis-based products, featuring a carrier-grade Linux operation system, and designed for high-performance deployment scenarios that need to scale to multiple terabits of switching capacity and support 10 and 40 gigabit Ethernet connections, and is designed eventually to support 100 gigabit Ethernet.

=== Virtual Services Platform 8000 Series ===
A compact form-factor platform delivering high-density 10/40 gigabit Ethernet connectivity, and targeted at mid-market through to mid-size enterprise core switch applications.

=== Virtual Services Platform 7000 Series ===
A range of high-end 10 gigabit Ethernet stackable switches that extend fabric-based networking to the data center top-of-rack. They support 40 gigabit Ethernet via the MDA Slot.

=== Virtual Services Platform 4000 Series ===
A range of high-end gigabit Ethernet stackable switches that extend Fabric-based networking to branch and metro locations.

=== Ethernet Routing Switch 5000 Series ===
A range of high-end gigabit Ethernet stackable switches that provides enterprise-class desktop features, including PoE, and offers 10 Gbit/s uplink connections. Each Switch supports up to 144 Gbit/s of virtual backplane capacity, delivering up to 1.152 Tbit/s for a system of eight, creating a virtual backplane through a stacking configuration.

=== Ethernet Routing Switch 4000 Series ===
A range of gigabit Ethernet stackable switches that provide enterprise-class desktop features, including PoE/PoE+, and offer 1/10 Gbit/s uplink connections. Each switch supports up to 48 Gbit/s of virtual backplane capacity, delivering up to 384 Gbit/s for a system of 8, creating a virtual backplane through a stacking configuration.

=== Ethernet Routing Switch 3500 Series ===
These entry-level gigabit Ethernet stackable switches provide enterprise-class desktop features, including PoE/PoE+, and 1 Gbit/s uplink connections.

== See also ==
- Avaya Networking
- Split Multi-Link Trunking
- Routed-SMLT
- Shortest Path Bridging
- Fabric computing
