= InterSwitch Trunk =

InterSwitch Trunk (IST) is one or more parallel point-to-point links (Link aggregation) that connect two switches together to create a single logical switch. The IST allows the two switches to share addressing information, forwarding tables, and state information, permitting rapid (less than one second) fault detection and forwarding path modification. The link may have different names depending on the vendor. For example, Brocade calls this an Inter-Chassis Link (ICL). Cisco calls this a VSL (Virtual Switch Link).

Edge switches, servers or PCs see the two aggregate switches as one large switch. This allows any vendor's equipment configured to use the IEEE 802.3ad static link aggregation protocol to connect to both switches and take advantage of load balancing, redundant connections.

The IST protocol was developed by Nortel (now acquired by Avaya, which is now acquired by Extreme Networks) to enhance the capabilities of Link aggregation, and is required to be configured prior to configuring the SMLT, DSMLT or R-SMLT functions on the two aggregate (core, distribution, or access) switches. The edge equipment can be configured with any of the following; Multi-Link Trunking (MLT), DMLT, IEEE 802.3ad static link aggregation, IEEE 802.3ad Static Gigabit EtherChannel (GEC), IEEE 802.3ad Static Fast EtherChannel (FEC), SMLT, DSMLT, and other static link aggregation protocols.

== Patent ==
United States Patent 7173934

== Product support ==
IST is supported on Nortel's Routing Switch 1600, 5000, 8300, ERS 8600, MERS 8600 products and also on Avaya's Virtual Services Platform VSP 7000 and VSP 9000.

== See also ==
- Avaya
- Avaya Government Solutions
