= Multi-link trunking =

Network link aggregation technology

- Nortel Multi-Link Trunking
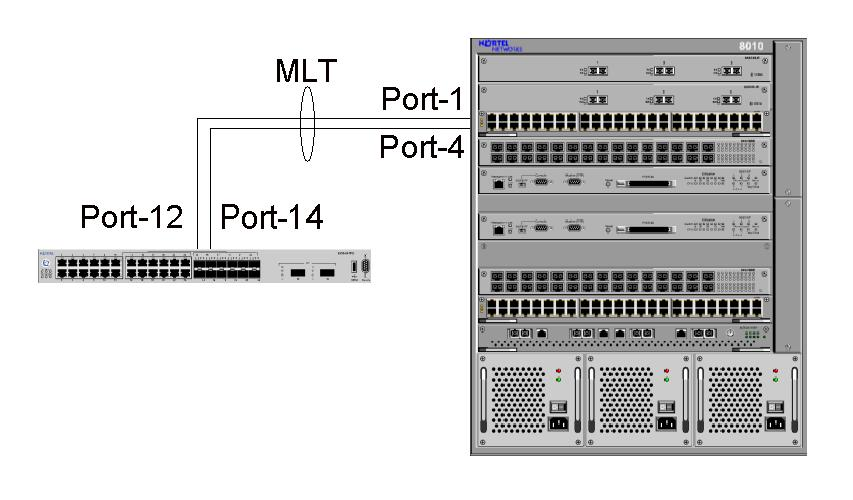
- MLT between ERS 5530 switch and an ERS 8600 switch

Multi-link trunking (MLT) is a link aggregation technology developed at Nortel in 1999. It allows grouping several physical Ethernet links into one logical Ethernet link to provide fault-tolerance and high-speed links between routers, switches, and servers.

MLT allows the use of several links (from 2 up to 8) and combines them to create a single fault-tolerant link with increased bandwidth. This produces server-to-switch or switch-to-switch connections that are up to 8 times faster. Prior to MLT and other aggregation techniques, parallel links were underutilized due to Spanning Tree Protocol’s loop protection.

Fault-tolerant design is an important aspect of Multi-Link Trunking technology. Should any one or more than one link fail, the MLT technology will automatically redistribute traffic across the remaining links. This automatic redistribution is accomplished in less than half a second (typically less than 100 millisecond) so no outage is noticed by end users. This high speed recovery is required by many critical networks where outages can cause loss of life or very large monetary losses in critical networks. Combining MLT technology with Distributed Split Multi-Link Trunking (DSMLT), Split multi-link trunking (SMLT), and R-SMLT technologies create networks that support the most critical applications.

A general limitation of standard MLT is that all the physical ports in the link aggregation group must reside on the same switch. SMLT, DSMLT and R-SMLT technologies removes this limitation by allowing the physical ports to be split between two switches.

== Split multi-link trunking ==
- Split Multi-Link Trunking
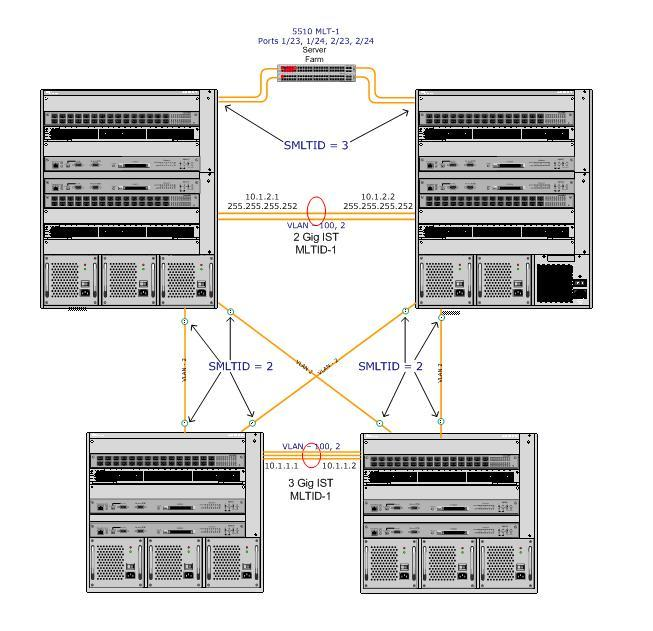
- SMLT mesh with nine 1Gig paths (all connections active and load balancing traffic) 9 Gbit/s full duplex mesh providing 18 Gbit/s of bandwidth between core switches.

Split multi-link trunking (SMLT) is a Layer-2 link aggregation technology in computer networking originally developed by Nortel as an enhancement to standard multi-link trunking (MLT) as defined in IEEE 802.3ad. US 7173934, Lapuh, Roger; Zhao, Yili & Tawbi, Wassim et al., "System, Device, and Method for Improving Communication Network Reliability Using Trunk Splitting", issued 2007-02-06

Link aggregation or MLT allows multiple physical network links between two network switches and another device (which could be another switch or a network device such as a server) to be treated as a single logical link and load balance the traffic across all available links. For each packet that needs to be transmitted, one of the physical links is selected based on a load-balancing algorithm (usually involving a hash function operating on the source and destination MAC address information). For real-world network traffic this generally results in an effective bandwidth for the logical link equal to the sum of the bandwidth of the individual physical links. Redundant links that were once unused due to Spanning Tree’s loop protection can now be used to their full potential.

A general limitation of standard link aggregation, MLT or EtherChannel is that all the physical ports in the link aggregation group must reside on the same switch. The SMLT, DSMLT and RSMLT protocols remove this limitation by allowing the physical ports to be split between two switches, allowing for the creation of Active load sharing high availability network designs that meet five nines availability requirements.

=== SMLT topologies ===
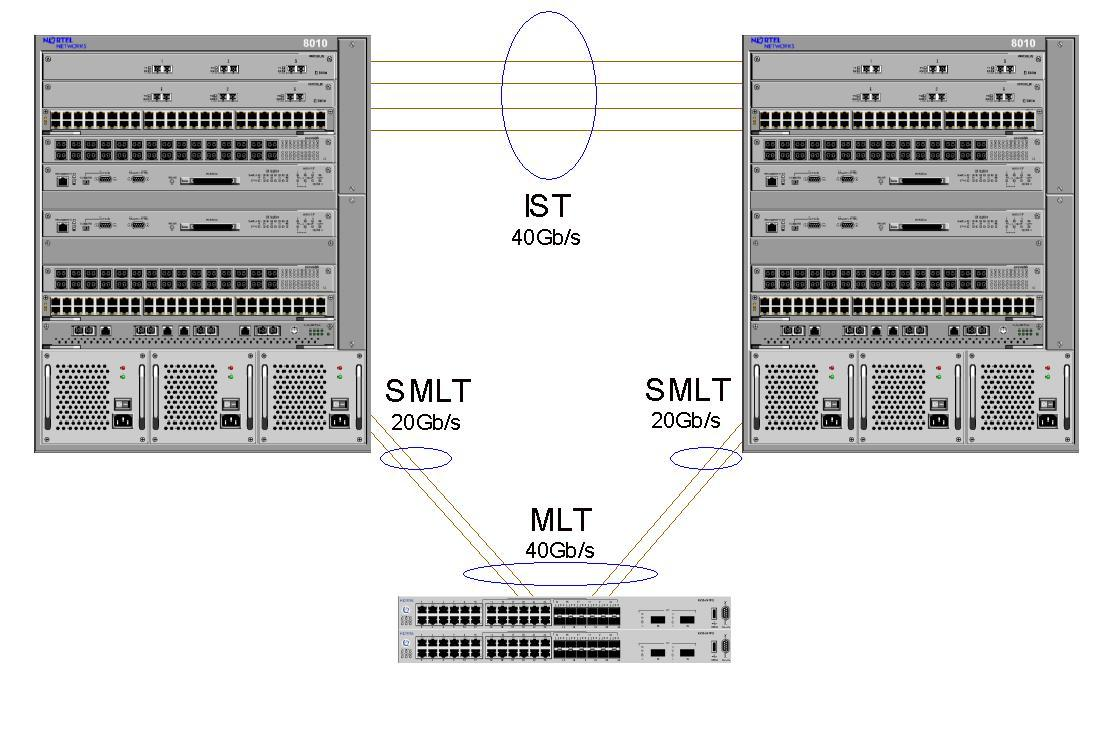
SMLT triangle between 3 Avaya switches 40 Gbit/s full duplex to edge switch

The two switches between which the SMLT is split are known as aggregation switches and form a logical cluster which appears to the other end of the SMLT link as a single switch.

The split may be at one or at both ends of the MLT. If both ends of the link are split, the resulting topology is referred to as an "SMLT square" when there is no cross-connect between diagonally opposite aggregation switches, or an "SMLT mesh" when each aggregation switch has a SMLT connection with both aggregation switches in the other pair. If only one end is split, the topology is referred to as an SMLT triangle.

In an SMLT triangle, the end of the link which is not split does not need to support SMLT. This allows non-Avaya devices including third-party switches and servers to benefit from SMLT. The only requirement is that IEEE 802.3ad static mode must be supported.

=== Operation ===
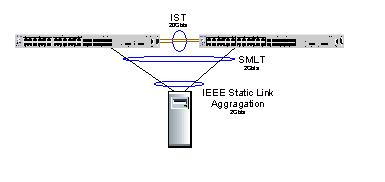
Server SMLT triangle

The key to the operation of SMLT is the Inter-Switch Trunk (IST). The IST is a (standard) MLT connection between the aggregation switches which allows the exchange of information regarding traffic forwarding and the status of individual SMLT links.

For each SMLT connection, the aggregation switches have a standard MLT or individual port with which an SMLT identifier is associated. For a given SMLT connection, the same SMLT ID must be configured on each of the peer aggregation switches.

For example, when one switch receives a response to an ARP request from an end station on a port that is part of an SMLT, it will inform its peer switch across the IST and request the peer to update its own ARP table with a record pointing to its own connection with the corresponding SMLT ID.

In general, normal network traffic does not traverse the IST unless this is the only path to reach a host which is connected only to the peer switch. By ensuring all devices have SMLT connections to the aggregation switches, traffic never needs to traverse the IST and the total forwarding capacity of the switches in the cluster is also aggregated.

The communication between peer switches across the IST allows both unicast and multicast routing information to be exchanged allowing protocols such as Open Shortest Path First (OSPF) and Protocol Independent Multicast-Sparse Mode (PIM-SM) to operate correctly.

=== Failure scenarios ===
SMLT

The use of SMLT not only allows traffic to be load-balanced across all the links in an aggregation group but also allows traffic to be redistributed very quickly in the event of link or switch failure. In general the failure of any one component results in a traffic disruption lasting less than half a second (normal less than 100 millisecond) making SMLT appropriate in environments running time- and loss-sensitive applications such as voice and video.

In a network using SMLT, it is often no longer necessary to run a Spanning Tree Protocol of any kind since there are no logical bridging loops introduced by the presence of the IST. This eliminates the need for spanning tree reconvergence or root-bridge failovers in failure scenarios which causes interruptions in network traffic longer than time-sensitive applications are able to cater for.

=== Product support ===
SMLT is supported within the following Avaya Ethernet Routing Switch (ERS) and Virtual Services Platform (VSP) Product Families: ERS 1600, ERS 5500, ERS 5600, ERS 7000, ERS 8300, ERS 8800, ERS 8600, MERS 8600, VSP 9000

SMLT is fully interoperable with devices supporting standard MLT (IEEE 802.3ad static mode).

== R-SMLT ==
Routed-SMLT (R-SMLT) is a computer networking protocol developed at Nortel as an enhancement to split multi-link trunking (SMLT) enabling the exchange of Layer 3 information between peer nodes in a switch cluster for resiliency and simplicity for both L3 and L2.

In many cases, core network convergence time after a failure is dependent on the length of time a routing protocol requires to successfully converge (change or re-route traffic around the fault). Depending on the specific routing protocol, this convergence time can cause network interruptions ranging from seconds to minutes. The R-SMLT protocol works with SMLT and distributed Split Multi-Link Trunking (DSMLT) technologies to provide sub-second failover (normally less than 100 milliseconds) so no outage is noticed by end users. This high speed recovery is required by many critical networks where outages can cause loss of life or very large monetary losses in critical networks.

RSMLT routing topologies providing an active-active router concept to core SMLT networks. The protocol supports networks designed with SMLT or DSMLT triangles, squares, and SMLT or DSMLT full mesh topologies, with routing enabled on the core VLANs. R-SMLT takes care of packet forwarding in core router failures and works with any of the following protocol types: IP Unicast Static Routes, RIP1, RIP2, OSPF, BGP and IPX RIP.

=== Product support ===
R-SMLT is supported on Avaya's Ethernet Routing Switch ERS 8600, ERS 8800, VSP9000, ERS 8300 and MERS 8600 products.

== Distributed multi-link trunking ==
- Avaya Distributed Multi-Link Trunking
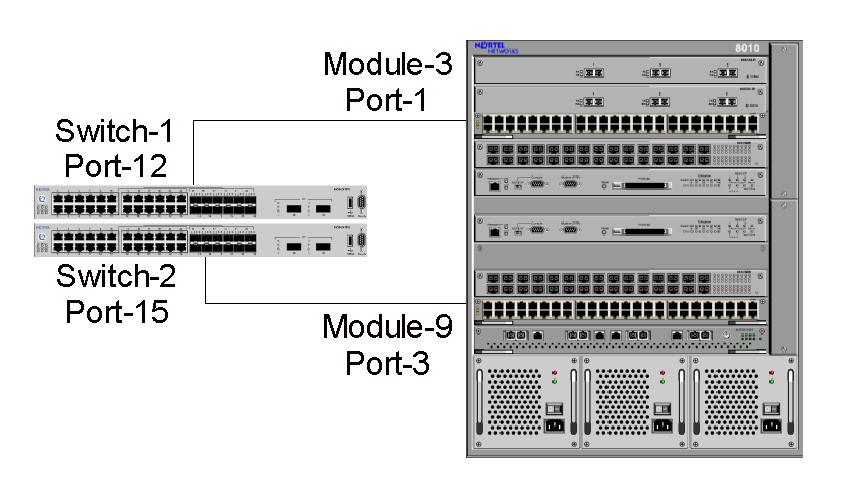
- DMLT between 2 stacked 5530 switches to an ERS 8600 switch
- DMLT between 2 stacked 5530 switches to an ERS 8600 switch

Distributed multi-link trunking (DMLT) or distributed MLT is a proprietary computer networking protocol designed by Nortel Networks, and now owned by Extreme Networks, used to load balance the network traffic across connections and also across multiple switches or modules in a chassis. The protocol is an enhancement to the Multi-Link Trunking (MLT) protocol.

DMLT allows the ports in a trunk (MLT) to span multiple units of a stack of switches or to span multiple cards in a chassis, preventing network outages when one switch in a stack fails or a card in a chassis fails.

DMLT is described in an expired United States Patent.

== Distributed split multi-link trunking ==
Distributed split multi-link trunking (DSMLT) or Distributed SMLT is a computer networking technology developed at Nortel to enhance the Split Multi-Link Trunking (SMLT) protocol. DSMLT allows the ports in a trunk to span multiple units of a stack of switches or to span multiple cards in a chassis, preventing network outages when one switch in a stack fails or one card in a chassis fails. US 6496502, Fite Jr., David B.; Ilyadis, Nicholas & Salett, Ronald M., "Distributed Multi-Link Trunking Method and Apparatus", issued 2002-12-17

Fault-tolerance is a very important aspect of Distributed Split Multi-Link Trunking (DSMLT) technology. Should any one switch, port, or more than one link fail, the DSMLT technology will automatically redistribute traffic across the remaining links. Automatic redistribution is accomplished in less than half a second (typically less than 100 milliseconds) so no outage is noticed by end users. This high speed recovery is required by many critical networks where outages can cause loss of life or very large monetary losses in critical networks. Combining Multi-Link Trunking (MLT), DMLT, SMLT, DSMLT and R-SMLT technologies create networks that support the most critical networks.

=== Product support ===
SMLT is supported on Avaya's Ethernet Routing Switch 1600, 5500, 8300, ERS 8600, MERS 8600, VSP-7000 and VSP-9000 products.
