= ECMP =

ECMP or e-CMP may refer to:

== Science and technology ==
- Equal-cost multi-path routing, in computer networking
- Electronic countermeasure pod
- Extracellular matrix protein
- e-CMP (Electric Common Modular Platform), an electric vehicle platform produced by Stellantis

== Other uses ==
- European Confederation of Modern Pentathlon, the federation of the European Modern Pentathlon Championships
