= Avaya ERS 8600 =

Networking router and switch

- ERS 8600 System
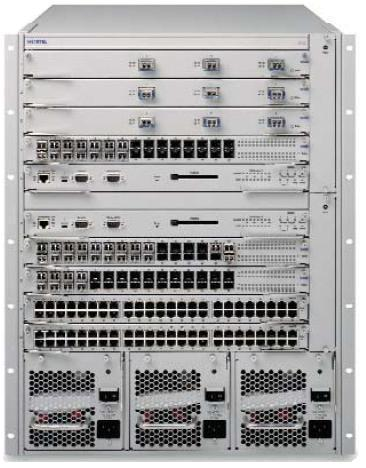

Ethernet Routing Switch 8610
- Height: 22.9 in. (58.2 cm)
- Width: 17.5 in. (44.5 cm)
- Depth: 19.9 in. (50.5 cm)
- Weight (empty): (fully loaded): 85 lb (39 kg); 225 lb (102 kg)
- Rack mountable: 19-inch standard rack

Ethernet Routing Switch 8606
- Height: 15.8 in. (40.1 cm)
- Width: 17.5 in. (44.5 cm)
- Depth: 19.9 in. (50.5 cm)
- Weight(empty): (fully loaded): 49 lb (22 kg); 140 lb (63 kg)
- Rack mountable: 19-inch standard rack

Certifications
- IPv6 * JITC'

The Avaya Ethernet Routing Switch 8600 or ERS 8600, previously known as the Passport 8600 or the Accelar 8000, is a modular chassis combination hardware router and switch used in computer networking. The system, originally designed and manufactured by Nortel, was manufactured by Avaya from 2009 until 2017. The system provided the 10G Ethernet equipment backbone for the 2010 Winter Olympics games, providing service for 15,000 VoIP Phones, 40,000 Ethernet connections and supporting 1.8 million live spectators. The system is configurable as a 1.440 Terabit Switch cluster using SMLT and R-SMLT protocols, to provide high reliability cluster failover (normally less than 100 millisecond).

There were three chassis options; a 3-slot chassis most commonly used for access or distribution / aggregation of switches which has a MTBF of 2,043,676hr., a 6-slot chassis for backbones of low density or high space premium environments, and a 10-slot chassis for high availability and high scalability. The chassis can be configured with one or two CPU modules and is normally configured with two or three load balancing power supplies.

At the end of 2010, software version 7.1 integrated the Virtual Enterprise Network Architecture (VENA) into the system, thus expanding the capabilities of this product to include network virtualization, cloud computing and IEEE Shortest Path Bridging (IEEE 802.1aq). The system provides connectivity for up to 48 ports, using 10 Gigabit Ethernet, Gigabit Ethernet, 100/10 Megabit Ethernet, or Packet over SONET/SDH

== History ==
The ERS 8600 is the successor to Nortel's Passport (formerly known as Accelar) 1000-series of routing switches.

=== Origins ===
Rapid City Communications, founded in April 1996, developed the F1200 routing switch in 1997. The main advantage of this product over others at the time was the ASICs on the modules allows the switching and routing of packets to take place on the ASIC chips within each module, instead of having to forward them to a central processing unit (CPU).

=== Bay Networks ===
In June 1997, Bay Networks agreed to acquire Rapid City for $155 million in stock (equivalent to $310.87 million in 2025). Bay Networks changed the name to the Accelar brand name in 1997. The F1200 was renamed Accelar 1200 and was initially released in January 1998.

=== Nortel Networks ===
When Nortel acquired Bay Networks in 1998, work had already begun on the next-generation routing switch, the 8000 series. A layer 2 version of the 8000 series, known as the Accelar 8100 Edge Switch, premiered in June 1999. In April 2000, the Accelar brand name was retired and the product renamed the Passport 8100. In May 2000, the Passport 8600 Routing Switch was released.

In May 2001, Nortel introduced one of the first 10 gigabit Ethernet switch modules at the N + I convention in Las Vegas.

In 2004, Nortel retired the Passport brand name and renamed the Passport 8600 to Ethernet Routing Switch 8600 (or ERS 8600).

=== Avaya ===
In December 2009, the ERS 8600 was sold to Avaya as part of the Enterprise business unit divestiture. In December 2011 this system completed evaluation and certification by the U.S. Joint Interoperability Test Command (JITC) testing center for use in the United States Department of Defense as an Assured Services Local Area Network (ASLAN). On 5 October 2015 it was announced that Avaya would stop manufacturing and selling the ERS 8600 platform by the end of 2016.

Various 8600 Modules
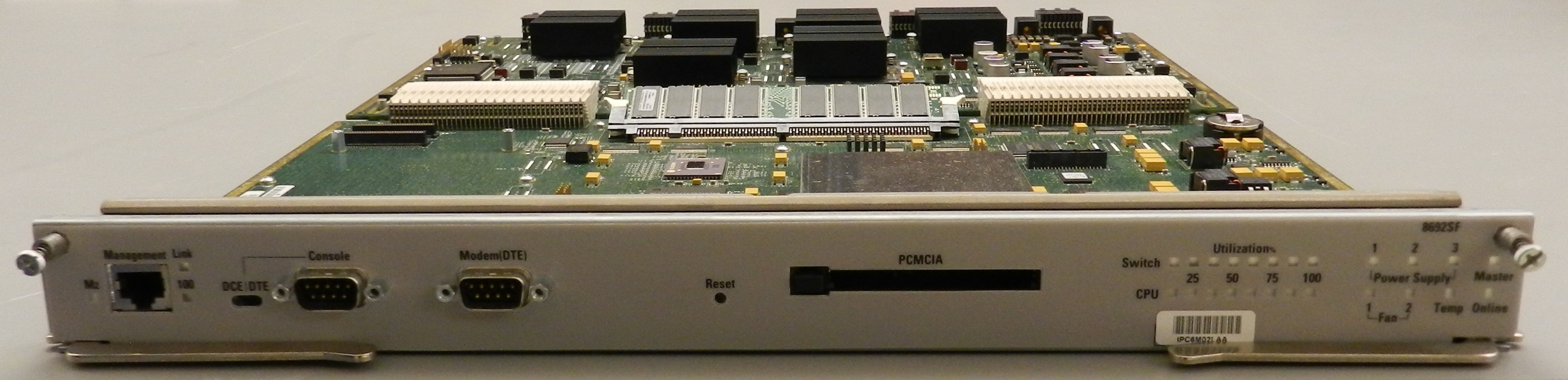
8692SF Switch Fabric Module without a mezzanine card

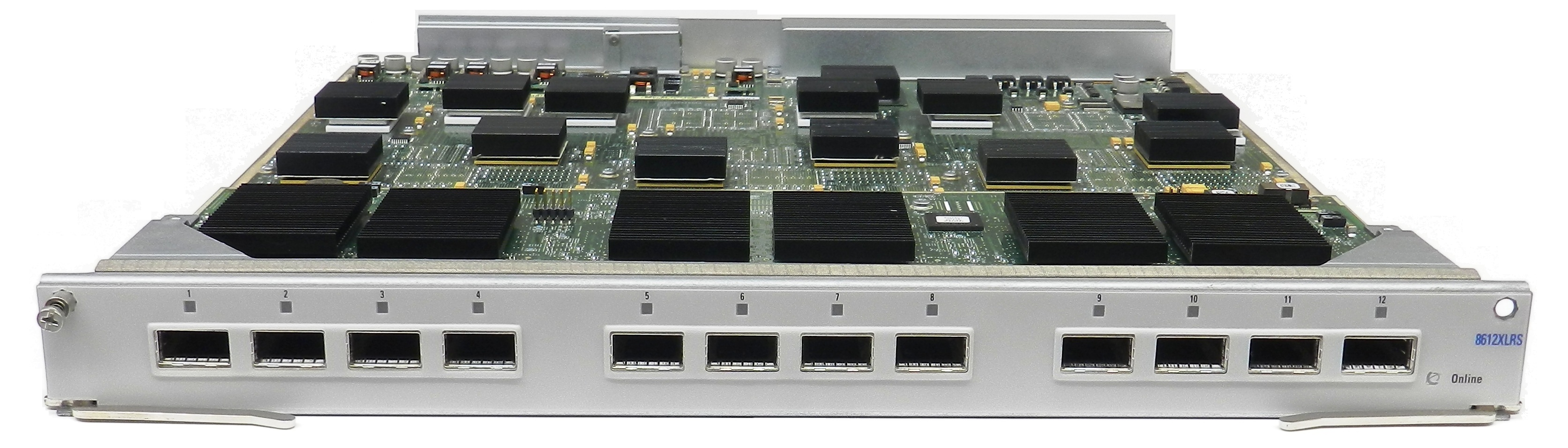
8612XLRS 10 Gigabit Ethernet Module (12 fiber ports)

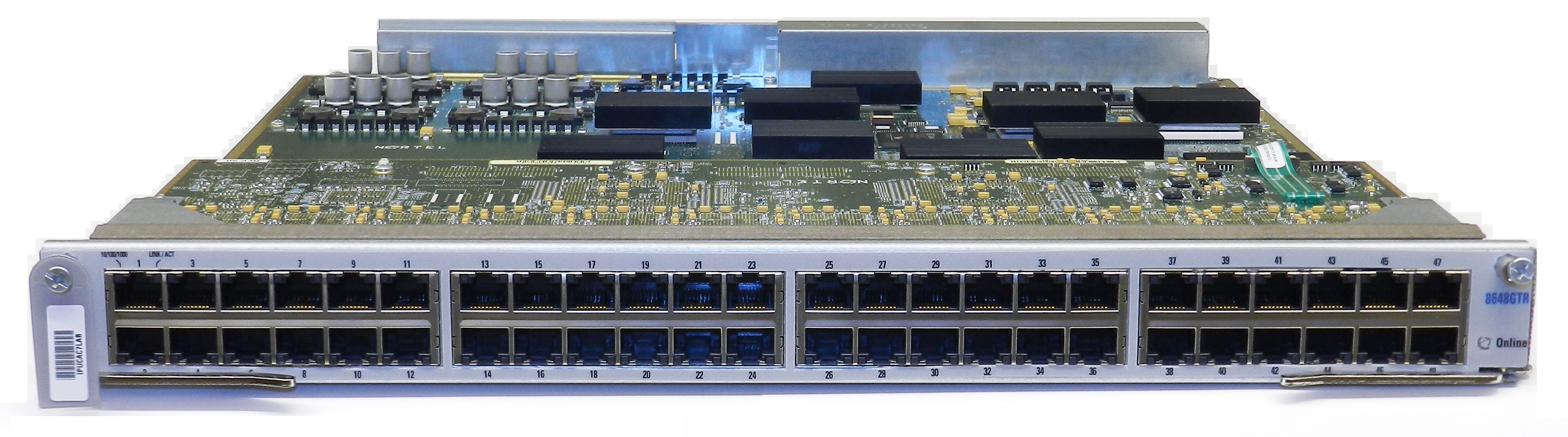
8648GTR Gigabit Ethernet Module (48 Ethernet ports)

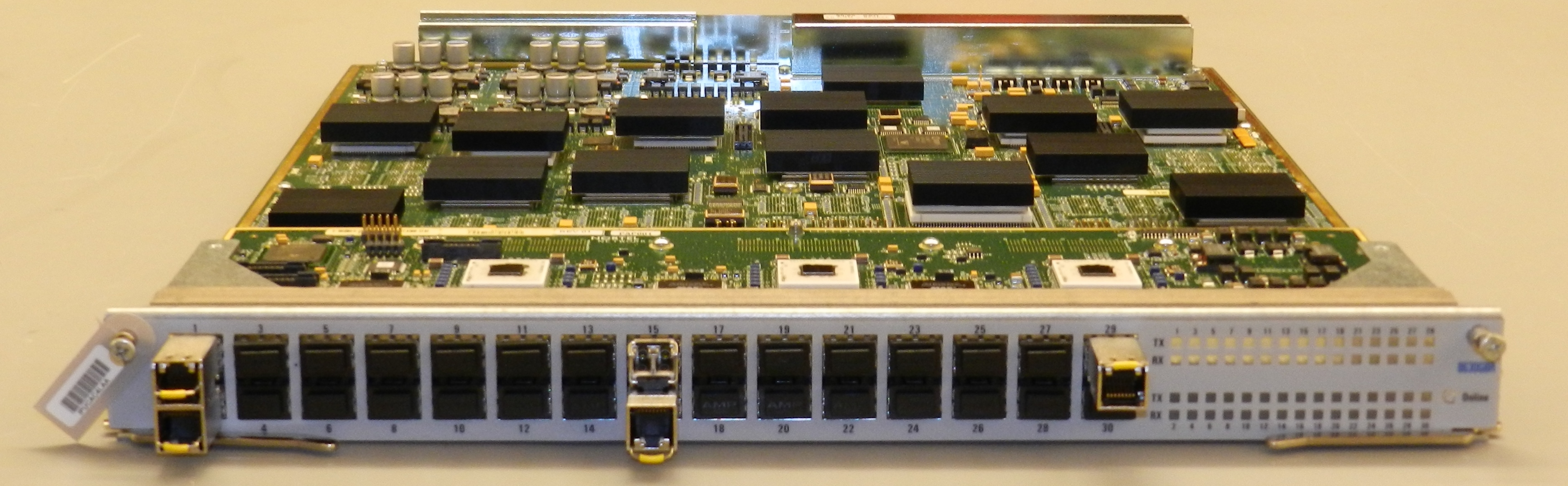
8630GBR Gigabit Ethernet Module (30 fiber ports)

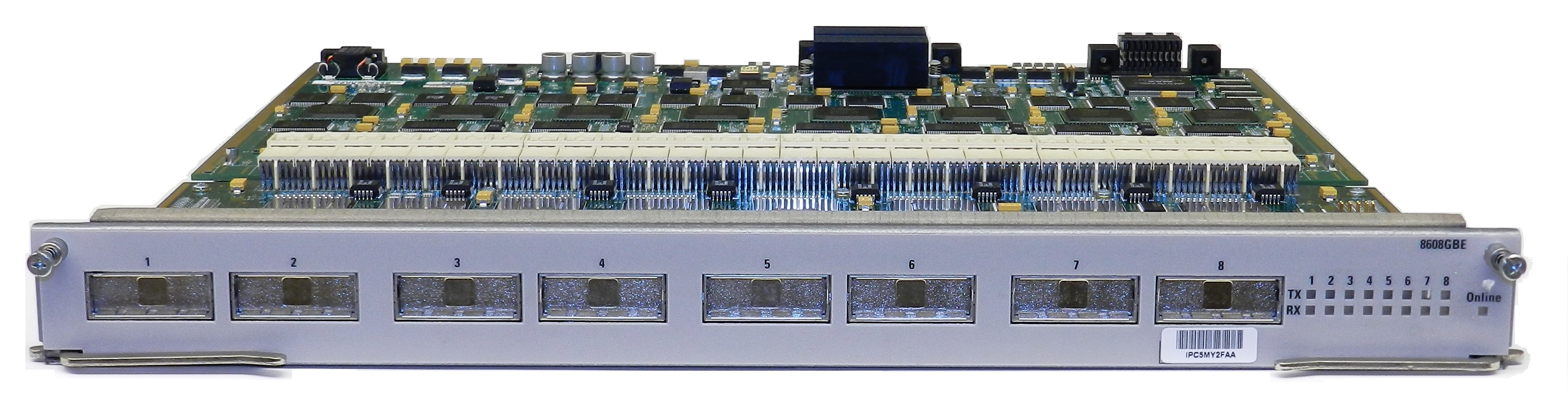
8608GBE Gigabit Ethernet Module (8 fiber ports)
