= 8800 series =

8800 series may refer to:

== Japanese train types ==
- Kintetsu 8800 series electric multiple unit
- Meitetsu 8800 series "Panorama DX" electric multiple unit
- Shin-Keisei 8800 series electric multiple unit
- Toei 8800 series tram

== Other ==
- Avaya ERS 8800 Series
- GeForce 8 series
