= Avaya VSP 4000 series =

Series of network switches

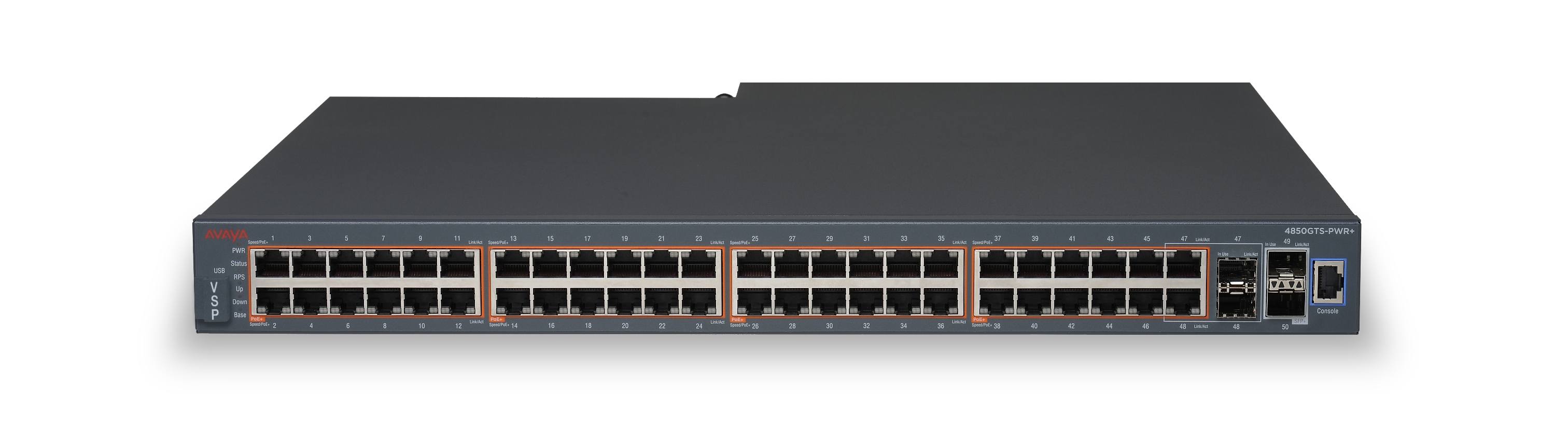
Avaya VSP 4850GTS-PWR+ 50-port Ethernet switch

The Avaya Virtual Services Platform 4000 series (VSP 4000) are products that, in computer networking terms, are standalone switch/routers (layer 2/layer 3) designed and manufactured by Avaya for Ethernet-based networks. The VSP 4000 hardware is a derivative of the earlier Ethernet routing switch 4000 series, leveraging certain shared components, but implementing a new, completely different, operating system derived from the virtual service platform 9000 series. The role of the VSP 4000 is to extend fabric-based network virtualization services to smaller, remote locations, thereby creating a single service delivery network.

The VSP 4000 offers a range of network virtualization services that are based on Avaya's extended implementation of Shortest Path Bridging; marketed as the 'Avaya VENA Fabric Connect' technology. The first software release supports:

- Layer 2 virtualized services that extend VLANs across the fabric (including across subnets and long distances)
- Layer 3 virtualized services that interconnect and extend VRFs across the fabric
- Native routing between layer 2 and layer 3 virtualized services for access to shared services
- IP shortcut routing that enables direct layer 3 connectivity between individual end-points without requiring deployment of an additional IGP (e.g. OSPF).

These capabilities are positioned are supporting the following deployment scenarios:

- Virtualized small and mid-sized Enterprise
- Distributed enterprise

Deployments would be made to facilitate the following business situations:

- End-to-end traffic separation for multi-tenancy or for security / regulatory compliance (i.e. PCI DSS)
- Integrated video surveillance

== History ==
The first VSP 4000 models were made available in April 2013. The first models delivered in the series were:

- VSP 4850GTS, a 1RU Layer 2/Layer 3 Switch that is equipped with 48 x 10/100/1000BASE-T ports (including two common Uplink ports offering SFP connectivity) plus 2 x 10 Gigabit Ethernet ports that feature SFP+ physical connectivity.
- VSP 4850GTS-PWR+, a similar product the VSP 4850GTS, with the addition of supporting 802.3at Power-over-Ethernet Plus (PoE+) on the copper ports.
- VSP 4850GTS-DC, a similar product the VSP 4850GTS, but with DC power instead of AC.

In June 2014, a further model was added:

- VSP 4450GSX-PWR+, a 1RU Layer 2/Layer 3 Switch that is equipped with 36 x 1000BASE-SFP ports, 12 x 10/100/1000BASE-T ports that support 802.3at PoE+, plus 2 x 10GBASE-SFP+ Ethernet ports (that also support Gigabit SFPs).

== See also ==
- Avaya Government Solutions
- Stackable switch
- Terabit Ethernet
