= Metro Ethernet Routing Switch 8600 =

- MERS 8600CO

Metro Ethernet Routing Switch 8610CO
- Height: 35.0 in. (88.9 cm)
- Width: 17.4 in. (44.2 cm)
- Depth: 23.7 in. (60.2 cm)
- Weight (empty): (fully loaded): 184 lb (83.5 kg); 315 lb (142.9 kg)
- Rack mountable: Yes, 19-inch standard rack

Metro Ethernet Routing Switch 8600 or MERS 8600 is a modular chassis router and/or switch manufactured by Nortel now acquired by Ciena. The MERS 8600 supports the Provider Backbone Bridges (PBB), Provider Backbone Transport (PBT) technologies and carrier class Operations Administration & Maintenance (OAM) tools.

Configurable as a 1.440 Terabit Switch cluster using SMLT and RSMLT protocols, cluster failover (normally less than 100 millisecond).

BT uses the MERS 8600 PBB/PBT technologies in its 21st Century Network (21CN) and India has selected this platform for the most extensive IP network ever deployed by an international airport in India.

The MERS 8600 has 3 chassis options

- 8006, 6-slot chassis for backbones of low density or high space premium
- 8010, 10-slot chassis for high availability and high scalability
- 8010CO, 10-slot NEBS-compliant chassis.

The chassis can be configured with one or two CPU modules (8692SF), and is normally configured with two or three load balancing power supplies.

== Modules ==
=== CPU Modules ===
- 8692omSF Switch Fabric and CPU 8692 with Expansion Mezzanine card, Supports 50 ms fail-over on NNI trunks with MultiLink Trunking
- 8692omSF Switch Fabric
- 8691 omSF Switch Fabric and CPU Module

=== 10 Gigabit Ethernet ===
- 8683 XLR, 3 ports 10 Gigabit Ethernet XFP (LAN PHY only)

=== Packet Over SONET ===
- 8683POSM, POS Baseboard supports up to 6 OC-3 or 3 OC-12 ports

=== VPN Modules ===
- 8668 VPN Module

=== Gigabit Ethernet ===
- 8630 GBR, 30 ports 1000 BaseX small form factor pluggable interfaces (SX, LX, CWDM, TX)
- 8608GBM, 8-port Gigabit Ethernet, GBIC-based
- 8608GTM, 8 ports 1000BASE-T, fixed Gigabit Ethernet

=== 100/10 Megabit Ethernet ===
- 8632TXM, 32 ports 10/100 plus 2 GBIC ports
- 8648TXM, 48 10/100TX ports

== See also ==
- Ciena
- Metro Ethernet
- Wavelength-division multiplexing
- Provider Backbone Bridges
- Provider Backbone Transport
