= ERS 3500 and ERS 2500 series =

Stackable routing switches

- Avaya Ethernet Routing Switch 2500 Series
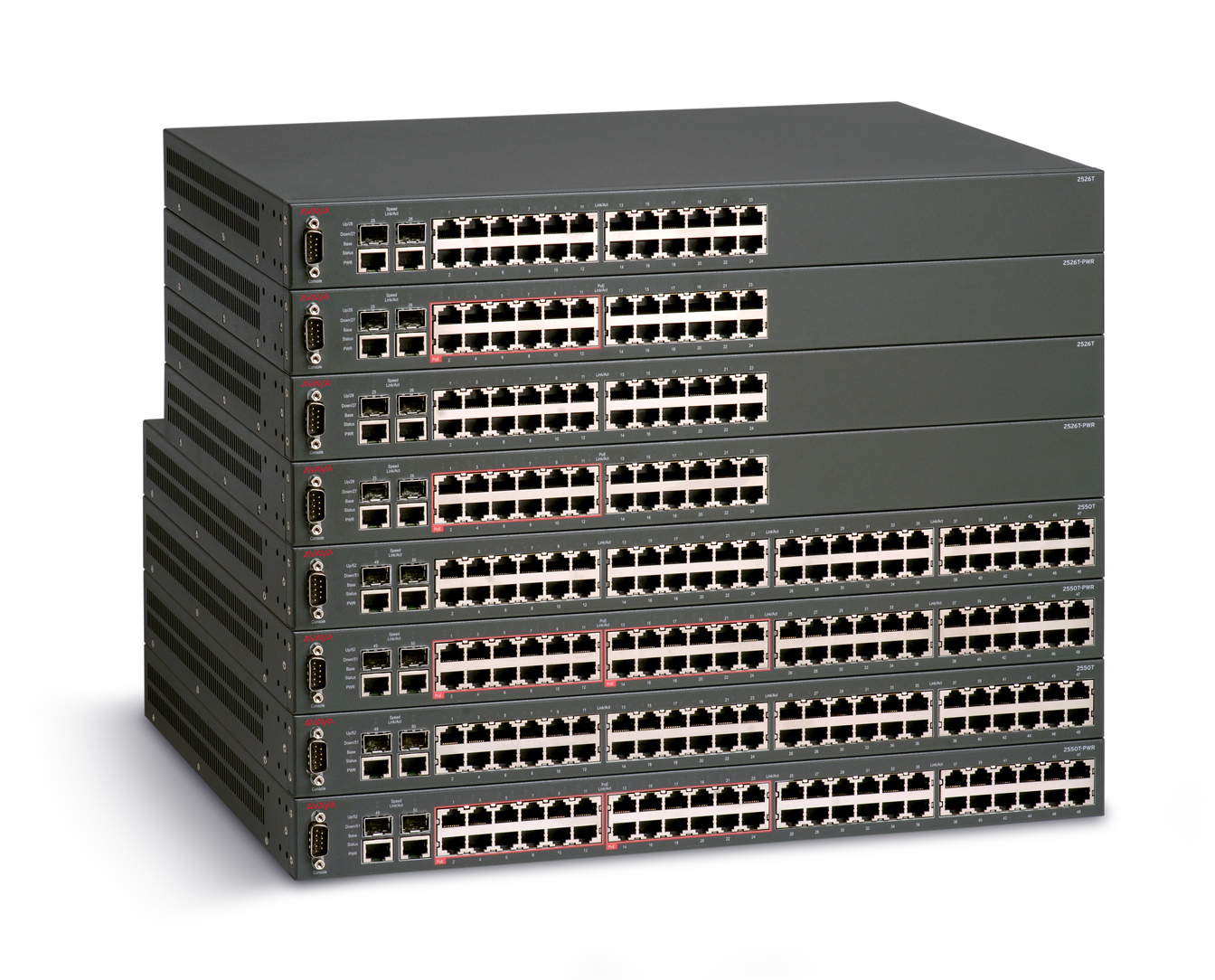

ERS 2526T / ERS2526T-PWR
- Rack mountable: 1RU, 19-inch standard rack

ERS 2550T / ERS 2550T-PWR
- Rack mountable: 1RU, 19-inch standard rack

Ethernet Routing Switch 3500 series and Ethernet Routing Switch 2500 series or ERS 3500 and ERS 2500 in data computer networking terms are stackable routing switches designed and manufactured by Avaya.

The Switches can be stacked up to eight units high through a 'stacking' configuration; Avaya markets this capability under the term 'Avaya Virtual Enterprise Network Architecture (VENA) Stackable Chassis'. This series of Switches consists of six ERS 3500 models, the ERS 3526T, ERS 3526T-PWR+, ERS 3510GT, ERS 3510GT-PWR+, ERS3524GT, ERS3524GT-PWR+ and four different ERS 2500 models, the ERS 2526T, ERS 2526T-PWR, ERS 2550T and the ERS 2550T-PWR. The 'PWR' suffix designation identifies the Switch that can provide Power-over-Ethernet on the copper Ethernet ports, the '+' suffix designation indicates that the Switch can provide PoE plus on the copper ports. These Switches are all covered by Avaya's Lifetime warranty.

== History ==
=== ERS 3500 ===
This series of Switches became available in April 2012 with software release 5.0

=== ERS 2500 ===
This product line became available in 2007 with software release 4.0 and the device was demonstrated in March at the 'Spring VoiceCon 2007'. In March 2007 the product started to ship, and then in May 2007 a detailed evaluation between this switch and two competitor's switches identified that this switch had a better performance and better total cost of ownership. In 2008 Layer 3 routing support, secure web access with https and TACACS+ were added to the software in version 4.2. In January 2008 another detailed evaluation of this systems was performed by Tolly Enterprises, LLC. comparing the 2500 systems to Catalyst 2960-24T and HP ProCurve 2626 and 2650 systems. In May 2009 Cisco published an evaluation and comparison between this switch and its 2000 and 3000 series switches as competitor published fear, uncertainty and doubt about the product not having the ability to do routing, even after the product had released the new routing software almost a year earlier. Later in November 2010 IGMP multicast and IPv6 management was added in version 4.3. As of February 2012 the software version 4.4 is the latest software released for the product which was currently published in August 2011.

== Scaling ==
=== ERS 3500 Series ===
The ERS 3500 Series consists or four gigabit Ethernet models the 3510GT, 3510GT-PWR+, 3524GT, and 3524GT-PWR+ along with 2 fast Ethernet models 35265T, and 3526T-PWR+. The Switch leverages 802.1AB link layer discovery protocol and LLDP media endpoint discover and auto discovery and auto configuration to allow the Switch to automatically configure or reconfigure itself for new phone installs or phone movement in 1 minute.

=== ERS 2500 Series ===
The switch can be installed initially as standalone and then field-upgraded via a license to support resilient 'Stackable Chassis' configuration of up to eight Switches. The stack-enabled version of the ERS 2500 Switches will not require a license kit or license file.

==== ERS 2550T and 2550T-PWR Models ====
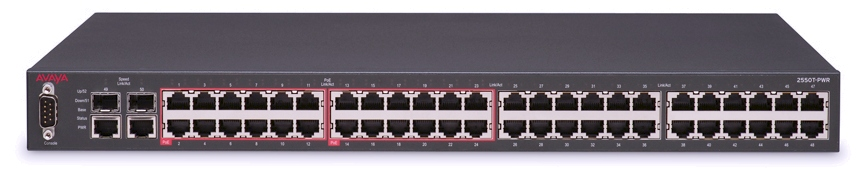
ERS 2550T-PWR

The ERS 2550T supports 48 ports of 10/100 plus two Gigabit uplink ports that are a combo configuration of 1000BASE-T/SFP. The ERS 2550T-PWR supports PoE capabilities on half of the user ports. System scaling is accomplished by stacking eight ERS 2550T-PWR systems together to provide up to 384 ports of copper 10/100BASE-T and with the ERS 2550T-PWR models, 192 of the ports will support Power-over-Ethernet (all the ports with the red border around them will support PoE - see the adjacent picture) and up to 16 ports of 1000BASE-X Small Form-factor Pluggable transceivers.

==== ERS 2526T and ERS 2526T-PWR Models ====
The ERS 2526T and ERS 2526T-PWR models offer 24 ports of 10/100 plus two Gigabit uplink ports that are a combo configuration of 1000BASE-T/SFP. The ERS 2526T-PWR model offers PoE support on half of the user ports. When staking eight ERS 2526T models it will provide 192 ports of copper 10/100BASE-T, and with the ERS 2526T-PWR models 96 of the ports will support PoE and up to 16 ports of 1000BASE-X Small Form-factor Pluggable transceivers. The system also has the ability to stack any combination of these Switches (up to 8 switches) in a system.

=== Stacking ===
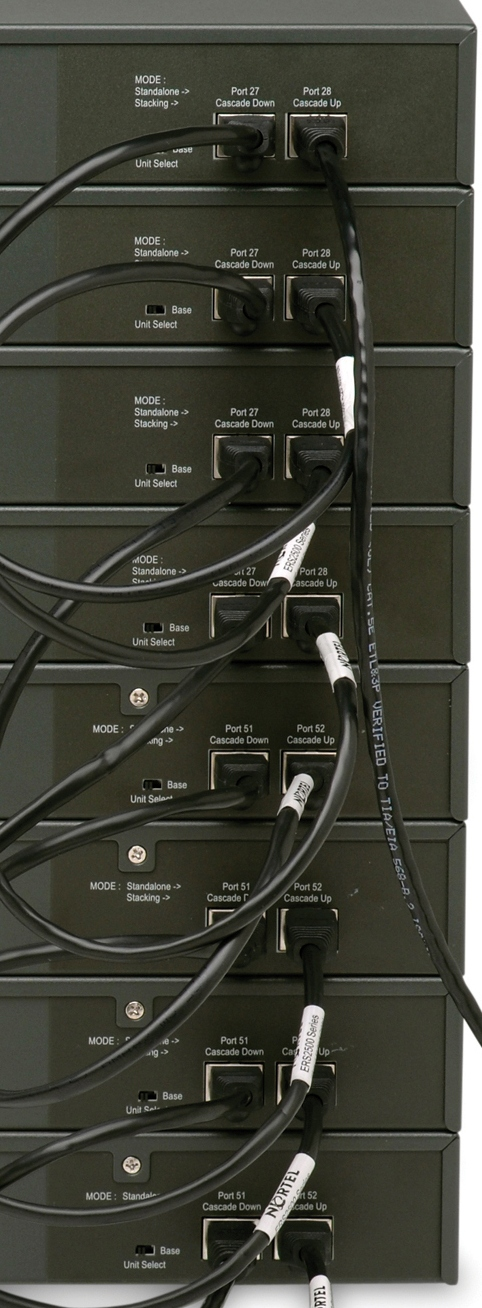
Rear view of a stack of 8 switches

The ERS 2500 Series of Switches can be stacked with Flexible Advanced Stacking Technology (FAST) to allows eight switches to operate as single logical system with a 32 Gbit/s virtual backplane. The stack operates on a bi-directional and shortest path forwarding star topology that allows traffic to flow either 'upstream' or downstream' simultaneously from every switch allowing packets to take the optimal forwarding path (shortest path). The bi-directional paths allow the traffic to automatically redirect around any switch in the stack that is not operating properly. This stacking technology allows stackable switches to operate with the same performance and resiliency as chassis solution. The entire stack can be managed from the base switch by several methods: Console into the base switch and use command line or a menu; telnet/SSH into the IP address of the base switch IP address and use command line; SNMP into the IP Address of the base switch to use the GUI configuration tools to management all switches on the stack at once.

==== Link aggregation across the stack ====
This switch allows for link aggregation from ports on different stacked switches either to other switches not in the stack (for example a core network) or to allow servers and other devices to have multiple connections to the stack for improved redundancy and throughput.

=== Models ===
	2526T	2526T-PWR	2550T	2550T-PWR
1 Gigabit Copper ports (Stacking or standalone)	2	2	2	2
10/100/1000 Gigabit SFP/Copper Ports (Copper ports share adjacent SFP)	2	2	2	2
10/100 Mbit/s Copper ports	24	24	48	48
PoE Ports	0	12	0	24
