= QFabric =

Proprietary technology

QFabric is a proprietary technology proposed by Juniper Networks. In contrary to open standards such as OpenFlow, QFabric is regarded as a vendor proprietary approach. Its goal is to simplify the traditional tree architecture of L2/L3 switches to a single tier any-to-any connectivity.

== Competing Technologies ==
Competing technologies to QFabric include IEEE 802.1aq, MC-LAG, VXLAN, FabricPath, Virtual Cluster Switching (VCS), and the IETF TRILL standard.

== System Components ==
QFabric System Components consists of:

- QFabric Nodes - fixed-configuration edge platforms that connect to networked data center devices
- QFabric Interconnect - a high-speed transport device that connects all QFabric Nodes in a full-mesh topology
- QFabric Director - which provides control and management services for the full QFabric System

== Performance Improvement ==
For data center architecture, QFabric creates a single logical switch that connects the entire data center rather than tiers of multiple access aggregation and core switches. The reason why this can improve performance is that, instead of going through multiple tiers of switches in a traditional network, packets only get through the infrastructure in a single hop, so this can reduce the delay significantly. For example, a typical switch can handle 200 ports, while QFabric can scale up to 6000 ports with lossless 10Gbps speed. In a QFX3000-M QFabric System, which supports up to 768 10GbE ports, the average end-to-end latency can be as short as 3 microseconds. In QFX3000-G QFabric System, although it supports up to 6,144 10GbE ports, by connecting all nodes in a full-mesh topology, it can achieve an average port-to-port latency of 5 microseconds.
