= Avaya VSP 9000 Series =

Series of network switches

- Virtual Services Platform 9000
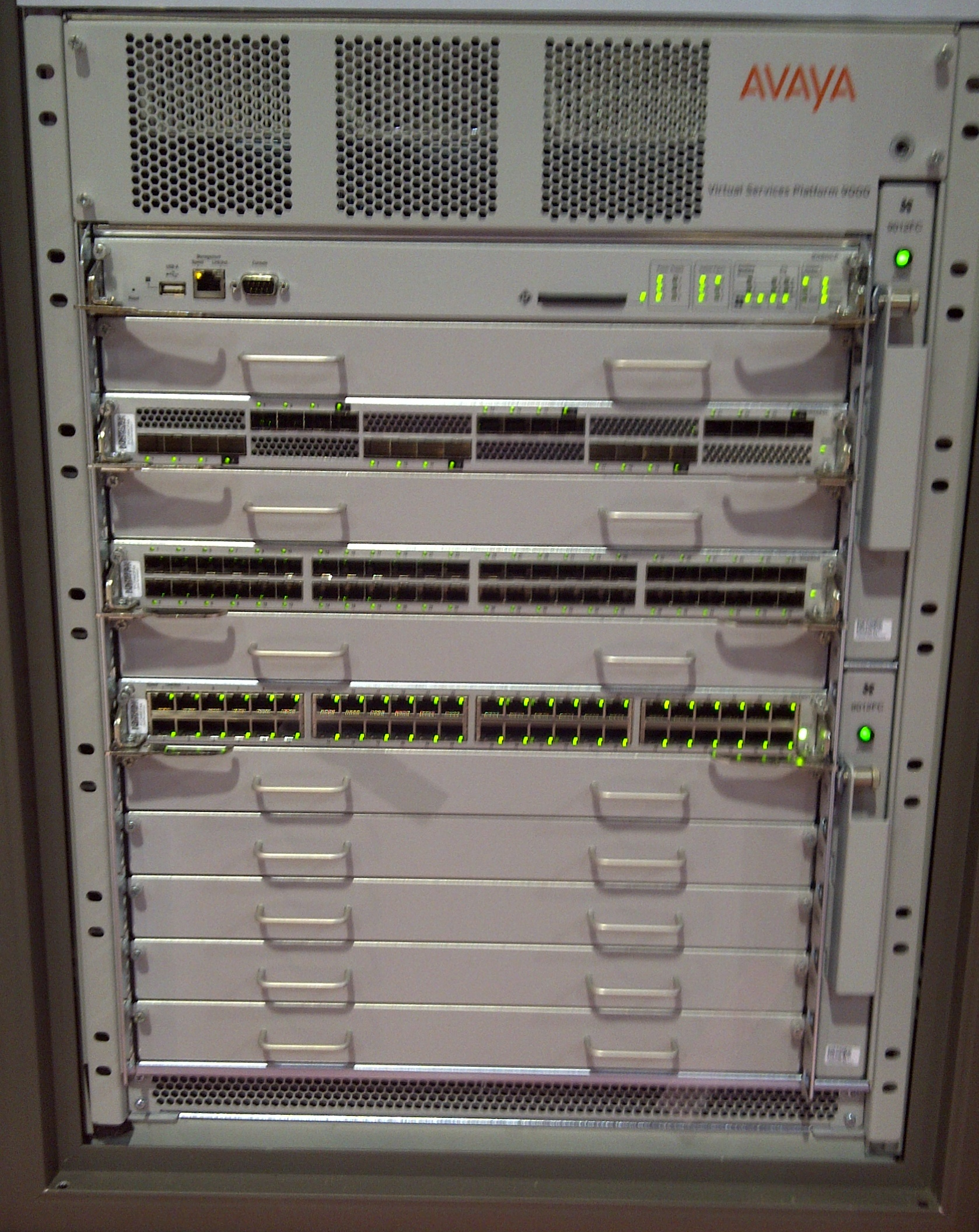

Avaya Virtual Services Platform 9000 Series or VSP 9000 is a set of modular chassis switches used in enterprise and data center networks, manufactured by Avaya. The VSP 9000 was targeted at institutions which were suffering from performance limitations, needed to simplify their network infrastructure in a virtualized environment, or required 10 Gigabit Ethernet with the option to scale to 40 or 100 Gigabit Ethernet. It is also an option for companies who are looking to reduce the power and cooling cost in order to maximize the cost-effectiveness of their infrastructures; this unit was also designed, and is expected, to have a lifespan of seven-to-ten years.

In 2013 the Olympics network backbone is built with VSP 9000 Switches supporting 30,000 users and up to 54 terabits per second of traffic.

On 7 March 2017 Avaya's Networks business was acquired by Extreme Networks.

== General specifications ==
The VSP 9000 Series consists of two Chassis models; the original 9012 Chassis supports twelve (12) horizontally-orientated front-panel slots, ten (10) of which are designated for I/O Modules and two reserved for CPU Modules, and the newer 9010 Chassis that support ten (10) vertically orientated slots, eight (8) for I/O Modules, again with two reserved for CPU Modules. The primary driver for the 9010 Chassis is where there is an exclusive requirement for front-to-back cooling.

The VSP 9000 supports up to 240 10 Gigabit Ethernet ports and is future-ready to support 40 Gigabit Ethernet and 100 Gigabit Ethernet ports which speed over 100 terabit per second Switch Cluster. The chassis also supports Shortest Path Bridging, Provider link state bridging, and Split multi-link trunking at up to 480 trunks with 16 links per trunk group. This product can also maintain over 4000 VLANs and IP interfaces with support for up to ten thousand static IP routes over an IP forwarding table with 500 thousand entries. Some more technological performance measures are as follows:

- VRRP interfaces: up to 512
- Circuitless IP instances: up to 256
- ECMP routes: up to 64k
- RIP instances: up to 64
- RIP routes: up to 10k
- OSPF instances: up to 64
- OSPF areas: up to 80
- OSPF adjacencies: up to 512
- OSPF routes: up to 64k
- BGP peers: up to 256
- BGP routes: up to 1,500k
- VRF instances: up to 512

== Rack scalability ==
- 720 × 10 Gigabit Ethernet ports
- 1440 × 1 Gigabit Ethernet ports

== See also ==
- Avaya
- Avaya Networking Products
- Avaya Government Solutions
- Avaya Professional Credentials
- Shortest Path Bridging
- Terabit Ethernet
- Split multi-link trunking
