= Avaya ERS 5600 Series =

Series of routers

- Avaya Ethernet Routing Switch 5600 Series
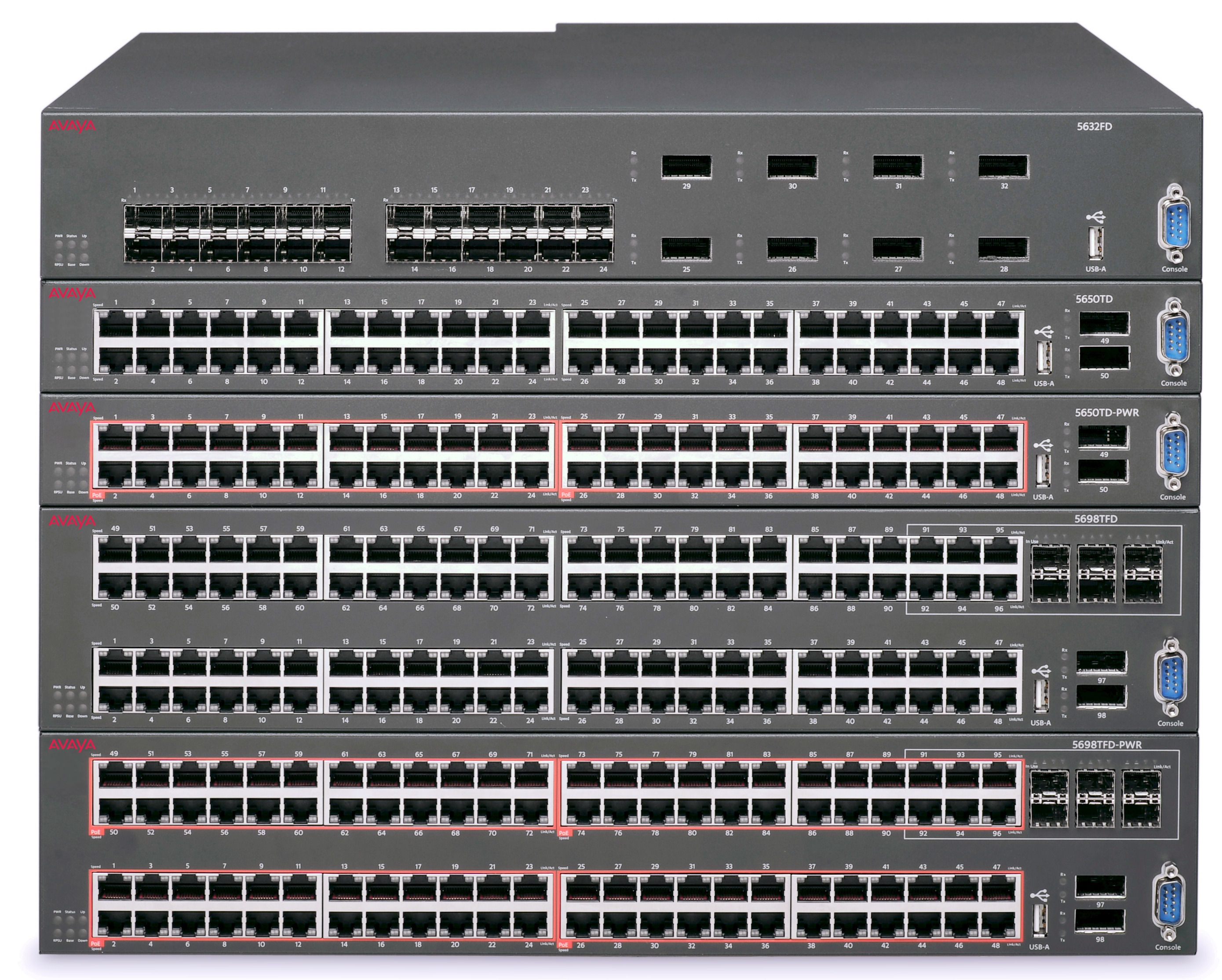

Ethernet Routing Switch 5600 Series or (ERS 5600) in computer networking terms are stackable routers and switches designed and manufactured by Avaya. The ERS 5600 Switches can be stacked up to 8 units high to create a 1.152 Tbit/s backplane through the Flexible Advanced Stacking Technology (FAST) stacking technology configuration. The 5600 Series consists of five stackable models that can be mixed and matched together with other ERS 5600 models or other ERS 5500 models to meet configuration requirements. Additionally the ports on the switches incorporates the Avaya Energy Saver (AES) which can manage and dim down (reduce the wattage requirements of each port and/or the PoE wattage) the power requirements to save energy across all switches in the enterprise.

The switches have an integrated time-domain reflectometer (TDR) built into every copper port, providing the ability to accomplish diagnostic monitoring and troubleshooting capabilities of the connected cables. This allows the equipment manager the ability to test and troubleshoot the cables for defects (crimped, cut, shorted or damaged cables) without going out to the switch room to test the cables from the switch to the end equipment. The tests can be accomplished on a single port or on multiple ports at the same time. The test can be accomplished through the command line or through one of several Graphical user interfaces called Device Manager (DM), Java Device Manager (JDM) or Enterprise Device Manager (EDM).

== History ==
In 2008 this Switch became available with the software release 6.0, which could be loaded on the newer 5600 models or the original 5500 models. The developmental history of this system extends back to the BayStack 5000 family shortly after the technology was bought from Bay Networks. Software version 6.0 added PIM-SM and Dual Agents. In June 2009 Software version 6.1 was released removing the licensing requirements for the IP Flow Information Export {IPFIX} feature, added force stack mode, and several security features. In July 2010 software version 6.2 became available adding Avaya Energy Saver, Bi-directional monitor port, and environmental commands.

In March 2011 the Australian Department of Defense began deploying these Switches as routing and switching platforms within the Wiring Closet, Data Center aggregation and network core. In December 2011 this system completed evaluation and certification by the U.S. Joint Interoperability Test Command (JITC) testing center for use in the United States Department of Defense as an Assured Services Local Area Network (ASLAN).

In July 2017 Extreme Networks acquired all of Avaya's core networking business, including the ERS 5600 series of switches.

== System Scaling ==
Systems scaling is accomplished by stacking up to eight of the ERS 5632FD units to provide up to 64 ports of 10 Gigabit Ethernet through XFP transceivers and 192 ports of 1000BASE-X Small Form-factor Pluggable transceivers; or stacking four ERS 5698TFD units to provide up to 8 ports of 10-gigabit Ethernet through XFP transceivers modules and 24 ports of 1000BASE-X Small Form-factor Pluggable transceivers and 144 ports of copper 10/100/1000BASE-T; or stacking eight ERS 5650TD units to provide 16 ports of 10 Gigabit Ethernet through XFP transceivers and 384 ports of copper 10/100/1000BASE-T connections. The ERS 5600 also has the ability to mix any combination of Switches of up to 8 units or up to 384 ports, whichever is reached first.

== Models ==
The specific models are the ERS 5632, 5650 and 5698 and the below table identifies the ports on each Switch.

| | 5632FD | 5650TD | 5650TD-PWR | 5698TFD | 5698TFD-PWR |
|---|---|---|---|---|---|
| 10 Gigabit XFP Ports | 8 | 2 | 2 | 2 | 2 |
| 1 Gigabit SFP Ports | 24 | 0 | 0 | 6 | 6 |
| 10/100/1000 Mbit/s Copper ports | 0 | 48 | 48 | 96 | 96 |
| PoE Ports | 0 | 0 | 48 | 0 | 96 |
