= Avaya VSP 7000 Series =

Standalone/stackable switches

- Virtual Services Platform 7000
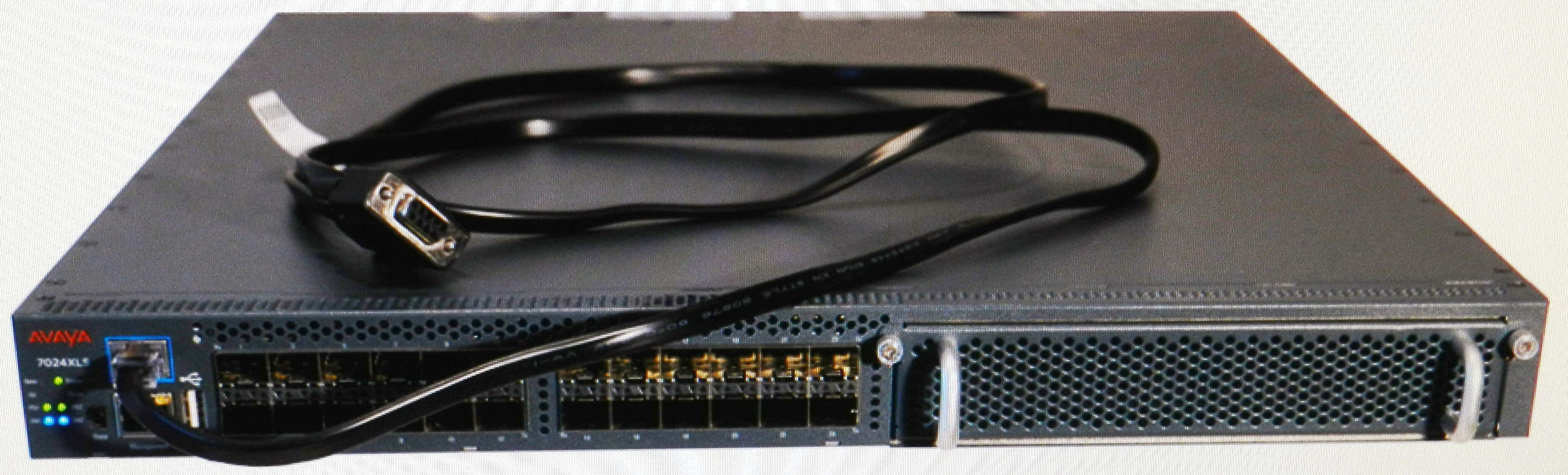

Avaya Virtual Services Platform 7000 Series or VSP 7000 is a set standalone/Stackable Switches, used in enterprise data networks, and data centers, manufactured by Avaya. This product is primarily offered to satisfy the top-of-rack (ToR) role for server farms and virtualized data centers. It supports Avaya's extended Shortest Path Bridging (SPB) implementation "Fabric Connect", and is future-ready for Edge Virtual Bridging (EVB) – IEEE 802.1Qbg, and Fiber Channel over Ethernet (FCoE). The system incorporates fifth generation application-specific integrated circuit (ASIC) chips with redundant and hot-swappable power supplies, fans, and expansion modules. The VSP 7000's unique architecture allows it to be meshed—fully or partially—with like devices, creating a high-capacity, low-latency network of up to 500 units, supporting up to 16,000 ports of 10GbE supported by a virtual backplane of up to 280 Tbit/s

== History ==
In November 2010, Avaya introduced its Virtual Enterprise Network Architecture (VENA) and in May 2011 this Switch, featuring 24 ports of fixed 10 Gigabit Ethernet was released as part of the VENA strategy. The VSP 7000 is future-ready for 40GbE and 100GbE by virtue of the Media Dependent Adapter (MDA) slot on the front panel, enabling in-service deployment of high-speed connections. The Switch is also future-ready for storage area networking. The company gained the foundational technology for the VENA strategy through its $915 million acquisition of Nortel Enterprise Solutions business unit in December 2009. The VSP 7000 supports 24 fixed ports at 1 or 10 Gigabits per second via SFP+ sockets and offers both front-to-back and back-to-front cooling options. It features field-replaceable fan trays and redundant AC or DC power supplies. The Application-specific integrated circuit (ASIC) technology allows the MDA to support additional 10GbE ports (8-port SFP+ and 10GBASE-T currently available, increasing port density to 32 ports), with future 40GbE (2-port), and 100GbE (1-port) planned. The VSP 7000 Series also futures integrated rear-mounted 'Fabric Interconnect' interfaces (four) that delivers—per Switch—640 Gbit/s aggregate (320 Gbit/s full-duplex) of bandwidth for Switch-to-Switch connectivity; Avaya market this technology as 'Distributed Top-of-Rack' (DToR). Recently added to the system is a Virtual Provisioning Service (VPS) that helps managers track and manage, provision and troubleshoot their virtual machine environments. The VPS technology works with VMware's VCenter (part of vSphere) to automate configuration changes. In September 2011 the system was reported as installed in the first US-based LEAP Center.

== Models ==
=== 7024XLS ===
The 7024XLS model supports 24 fixed ports of 10 Gigabit Ethernet SFP+ and is designed to also support 40 Gigabit Ethernet, 100 Gigabit Ethernet and Fibre Channel via the MDA (Media Dependent Adapter) slot.

- 1.280 Gbit/s switching fabric bandwidth
- Dedicated rear-panel 'Fabric Interconnect' ports supporting up to 640 Gbit/s of aggregate virtual backplane capacity
- Dual AC or DC Power Supplies for redundancy
- MDA slot for port expansion/uplink modules
- Hot-swap Back to front or Front to back cooling
- 261,500 hours mean time between failures (MTBF)

=== 7024XT ===
The more recent 7024XT model supports 24 fixed ports of 10GBASE-T, and as per the 7024XLS, supports expansion up to 32 ports of 10 Gigabit or the addition of two 40 Gigabit links, via the MDA slot.

== Media Dependent Adapters (MDAs) ==
=== 7002QQ ===
- 2-port 40 Gigabit Ethernet MDA supporting QSFP+ connections

=== 7008XLS ===
- 7008XLS 8-port 1/10 Gigabit Ethernet MDA supporting SFP+ connections

=== 7008XT ===
- 7008XT 8-port 10GBASE-T MDA supporting RJ45 connections

=== Proposed future MDAs ===
- 1-port 100 Gigabit Ethernet MDA

== See also ==
- Avaya
- Avaya Networking Products
- Avaya Government Solutions
- Avaya Professional Credentials
- Comparison of Stackable Switches
- Stackable Switch
- Terabit Ethernet
