= Avaya =

American technology company

Avaya LLC
- Formerly: Avaya Inc.
- Type: Private
- Traded as: NYSE: AV (no longer traded) NYSE: AVYA (2017-2023) S&P 500 component (2000-2007) Russell 1000 component (formerly until 2023)
- Industry: Technology
- Predecessor: Lucent Technologies
- Founded: 2000; 26 years ago
- Headquarters: Morristown, New Jersey, United States
- Area served: Worldwide
- Key people: Jeff Clarke (CEO)
- Products: Customer experience management Contact center operations Unified communications
- Revenue: ▲US$2.97 billion (2021)
- Operating income: ▲US$180 million (2021)
- Net income: ▲US$−13 million (2021)
- Total assets: ▼US$5.99 billion (2021)
- Total equity: ▲US$392 million (2021)
- Number of employees: ▼7,090 (2022)
- Website: avaya.com

Avaya LLC (/ə.ˈvaɪ.ə/), formerly Avaya Inc., is an American multinational technology company headquartered in Morristown, New Jersey. The company provides software and services for customer experience management, contact center operations, and unified communications. It serves more than 90,000 customers.

== History ==
In 1995, AT&T Corporation renamed their subsidiary AT&T Technologies to Lucent Technologies and was transferred in 1996. Lucent subsequently repurposed units of its own in an attempt to restructure its struggling operations.

Avaya Inc. was spun off from Lucent as its own company in 2000 (Lucent merged with Alcatel SA in 2006, becoming Alcatel-Lucent, which was purchased in turn by Nokia in 2016). Avaya Inc. were listed on the NYSE using the symbol AV from 2000 to 2007. In October 2007, Avaya Inc. was acquired for $8.2 billion by Sierra Holdings Corp owned by two private-equity firms, TPG Capital and Silver Lake Partners. On June 6, 2011 Sierra Holdings Corp. was renamed Avaya Holdings Corp.

In May 2001, certain Avaya, Inc products and manufacturing processes were acquired by Celestica. The locations of Avaya's Denver, Colorado and Little Rock, Arkansas were for Celestica to supply telecommunications products such as printed circuit boards and systems repair, test, and assembly. This acquisition of Avaya's certain assets were for Celestica to establish a five-year contract in manufacturing outsourcing partnership and supply chain management for a more diverse telecommunication products for Celestica and become Avaya's Electronics manufacturing services contractor.

On November 19, 2014, Avaya was confirmed as the naming rights partner for the San Jose Earthquakes' new stadium, officially called Avaya Stadium, paying $20 million over a 10-year deal.

On January 19, 2017, Avaya Inc. and related affiliates including Avaya Holdings Corp. petitioned for protection from creditors during reorganizing under Chapter 11 bankruptcy. A restructuring plan for Avaya Holdings Corp. agreed upon during mediation was given effect by the court's order November 28, 2017.

In December 2017, Avaya requested a federal judge to reduce their commitment to the Earthquakes' stadium name agreement. After Avaya vacated their naming rights, the venue was renamed Earthquakes Stadium in 2020 and PayPal Park in 2021 after PayPal bought the naming rights.

On December 15, 2017, trading in Avaya Holdings Corp. shares listed on the NYSE began under the symbol AVYA.

On February 14, 2023, Avaya once again petitioned for protection from creditors during restructuring under Chapter 11 with a restructuring plan already agreed on with their creditors. On February 15, 2023 the NYSE announced that shares of Avaya no longer qualified for listing on the New York Exchange and would cease to be traded there. Although the proposed restructuring plan would wipe out the shares, several securities dealers announced that they would begin making a market in Avaya shares effective February 16, 2023 using the symbol AVYAQ and trading 'over the counter', i.e. a securities dealer is a counterparty of each trade. On May 1, 2023, Avaya Holdings Corp. completed its financial restructuring, emerging from bankruptcy owned by its former creditors as the private company Avaya LLC.

== Acquisitions and partnerships ==
Since 2001, Avaya has sold and acquired several companies. Through Nortel's bankruptcy proceedings, assets related to their Enterprise Voice and Data business units were auctioned. Avaya placed a $900 million bid, and was announced as the winner of the assets on September 14, 2009. In 1985, Performance Engineering Corporation (later PEC Solutions) was formed to offer technology services to government customers. On June 6, 2005, Nortel acquired PEC Solutions to form Nortel PEC Solutions. On January 18, 2006, Nortel PEC Solutions was renamed Nortel Government Solutions. On December 21, 2009, Avaya acquired Nortel's government business as part of the company's assets sale.

In October 2019, Avaya entered into a strategic partnership with RingCentral and together, introduced a new unified communications as a service solution called Avaya Cloud Office ("ACO"). RingCentral also contributed $500 million to be the exclusive provider of the new Avaya UCaaS offering.

Avaya's headquarters are at 350 Mt. Kemble Avenue, Morristown, New Jersey 07960 US.

Avaya sponsors the IAUG users' group and training programs for IT professional certification in the use of Avaya's products.

== Patents ==
Avaya has over 4,400 patents and patents pending. In January 2021, the company disclosed it had received its 600th patent for Contact Center technologies, which was granted for AI in "chatbot socialization."
