= Resilient Packet Ring =

Technology for computer networking

Resilient Packet Ring (RPR), as defined by IEEE standard 802.17, is a protocol designed for the transport of data traffic over optical fiber ring networks. The standard began development in November 2000 and has undergone several amendments since its initial standard was completed in June 2004. The amended standards are 802.17a through 802.17d, the last of which was adopted in May 2011. It is designed to provide the resilience found in SONET and Synchronous Digital Hierarchy networks (50 ms protection) but, instead of setting up circuit oriented connections, provides a packet based transmission, in order to increase the efficiency of Ethernet and IP services.

== Technical details ==
RPR works on a concept of dual counter rotating rings called ringlets. These ringlets are set up by creating RPR stations at nodes where traffic is supposed to drop, per flow (a flow is the ingress and egress of data traffic). RPR uses Media Access Control protocol (MAC) messages to direct the traffic, which can use either ringlet of the ring. The nodes also negotiate for bandwidth among themselves using fairness algorithms, avoiding congestion and failed spans. The avoidance of failed spans is accomplished by using one of two techniques known as steering and wrapping. Under steering, if a node or span is broken, all nodes are notified of a topology change and they reroute their traffic. In wrapping, the traffic is looped back at the last node prior to the break and routed to the destination station.

== Class of service and traffic queues ==
All traffic on the ring is assigned a Class of Service (CoS) and the standard specifies three classes. Class A (or High) traffic is a pure committed information rate (CIR) and is designed to support applications requiring low latency and jitter, such as voice and video. Class B (or Medium) traffic is a mix of both a CIR and an excess information rate (EIR; which is subject to fairness queuing). Class C (or Low) is best effort traffic, utilizing whatever bandwidth is available. This is primarily used to support Internet access traffic.

== Spatial reuse ==
Another concept within RPR is what is known as spatial reuse. Because RPR strips the signal once it reaches the destination (unlike a SONET UPSR/SDH SNCP ring, in which the bandwidth is consumed around the entire ring) it can reuse the freed space to carry additional traffic. The RPR standard also supports the use of learning bridges (IEEE 802.1D) to further enhance efficiency in point to multipoint applications and VLAN tagging (IEEE 802.1Q).

One drawback of the first version of RPR was that it did not provide spatial reuse for frame transmission to/from MAC addresses not present in the ring topology. This was addressed by IEEE 802.17b, which defines an optional spatially aware sublayer (SAS). This allows spatial reuse for frame transmission to/from MAC address not present in the ring topology.

== See also ==
- Ethernet Automatic Protection Switching
- Spatial Reuse Protocol (Cisco)
- Metro Ring Protocol (Foundry Networks)
- Open Transport Network (Nokia Siemens Networks)
- Dynamic Packet Transport (Cisco)
- Ethernet Ring Protection Switching (ITU-T)
