= Unicast flood =

Treatment of unicast as broadcast

In computer networking, a unicast flood occurs when a switch receives a unicast frame and the switch does not know that the addressee is on any particular switch port. Since the switch has no information regarding which port, if any, the addressee might be reached through, it forwards the frame through all ports aside from the one through which the frame was received.

== Background ==
Unicast refers to a one-to-one transmission from one node in a network to another. This diagram illustrates the unicast transmission of a frame from one network node to another:

When a switch receives a unicast frame with a destination address not in the switch’s forwarding table, the frame is treated like a broadcast frame and sent to all network segments to which it is attached except the one from which it received the frame:

== Causes ==
The learning process of transparent bridging requires that the switch receive a frame from a device before unicast frames can be forwarded to it. Before any such transmission is received, unicast flooding is used to ensure transmissions reach their intended destinations. This is normally a short-lived condition as receipt typically produces a response that completes the learning process. The process occurs when a device is initially connected to a network segment, or after its address and port identifier is purged from the forwarding information base. An entry is purged when the link goes down on the original port or when it expires due to inactivity (five minutes is the default on many switches). A time limit is necessary because a switch does not necessarily see any indication when a network node is moved or disconnected.

When a bridge or switch has no room left in its forwarding information base and so cannot add an entry for a new node, it must forward any frame addressed to that node through all ports except the one on which the frame was received. This is a common problem on networks with many hosts. Less common is the artificial flooding of address tables in a MAC flooding attack.

Another common cause is a host with an ARP cache timeout longer than the timeout of the forwarding information base (FIB) in a switch—the switch forgets which port connects to the target before the host forgets the MAC address of the target. This can be prevented by configuring the switch with a FIB timeout longer than the ARP cache timeouts of nodes on its network. When a node needs to send a frame to a host after its corresponding ARP cache entry expires it must first send an ARP broadcast frame, which the switch must forward through all ports, to discover the (current) MAC address of the host.

Misconfigured features of the networks may lead to unicast flooding as well. If there are two layer-2 paths from Host A to B and Host A uses path 1 to talk to Host B, but Host B uses path 2 to respond to Host A, then intermediate switches on path 1 will never learn the destination MAC address of Host B and intermediate switches on path 2 will never learn the destination MAC address of Host A.

A final cause of unicast floods are topology changes. When a link state changes on a network port that participates in Rapid Spanning Tree Protocol, the address cache on that switch will be flushed causing all subsequent frames to be flooded out of all ports until the addresses are relearned by the switch.

== Remedies ==
A feature blocking unicast floods is available on Cisco switches but is not enabled by default. After ensuring that timeouts and security features have been configured to maintain table entries on client access ports longer than typical host ARP cache timeouts, this command is used to quiet down the unicast floods on those ports:

Switch(config-if)# switchport block unicast

Other techniques involve isolating hosts at Layer 2. Ports configured as protected ports are forbidden to communicate with other protected ports. Private VLANs implements port isolation such that members of the VLAN are only allowed to communicate via a designated uplink are not allowed to talk to other members of the VLAN.

== Effects on Networks ==
When a network is experiencing unicast flooding, network performance may be degraded. Here is a graph of a bridge before and after adjusting the size of the bridge address cache:

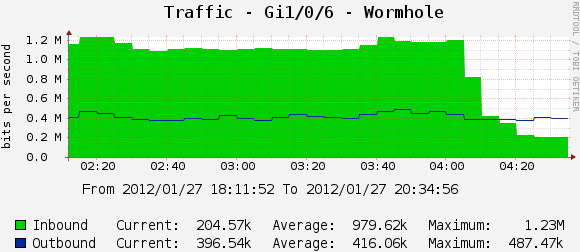

80% of the frames were flooded out never to be received by the destination address, while 20% was valid traffic. In high-volume networks, the flooded traffic may cause ports to saturate, leading to packet loss and high latency.

Another side effect of exhausted address tables is the compromise of data. The security considerations are discussed in the MAC flooding—one of several causes of unicast floods. If an end user is running a packet sniffer, the flooded frames can be captured and viewed.

== See also ==
- Broadcast, unknown-unicast and multicast traffic
