= DPT =

DPT may refer to:

== Science and medicine ==
- Dpt (unit) (dioptre/diopter), most commonly a unit measuring refraction and power in a lens or curved mirror
- Deep pressure therapy, a sensory integration therapy
- Dermatopontin, a human extracellular matrix protein
- Dipropyltryptamine, a psychedelic tryptamine
- DPT vaccine, vaccine against diphtheria, pertussis and tetanus, also referred as DTP
- Doctor of Physical Therapy
- Distributed Processing Technology
- Dynamic Packet Transport

== Politics ==
- Democratic Party of Turkmenistan
- Democratic peace theory, in political science
- Druk Phuensum Tshogpa, a political party in Bhutan

== Entertainment ==
- Dumbarton People's Theatre, a Scottish theatre group
- Dirty Pretty Things (band), an English band founded in 2005
- Dirty Pretty Things (film), a 2002 British drama

== Transportation ==
- DPT, the National Rail station code for Devonport railway station, Devon, England
- Dublin Port Tunnel

== Other ==
- State Planning Organization (Devlet Planlama Teşkilatı), former government body in Turkey
- A department
