= Metro Ring Protocol =

The Metro Ring Protocol (MRP) is a proprietary Layer 2 resilience protocol developed by Foundry Networks and currently being delivered in products manufactured by Brocade Communications Systems and Hewlett Packard. The protocol quite tightly specifies a topology in which layer 2 devices, usually at the core of a larger network, are configured and as such is able to achieve much faster failover times than other Layer 2 protocols such as Spanning Tree Protocol.

== See also ==
- ITU-T G.8032 Ethernet Ring Protection Switching
- EAPS, Ethernet Automatic Protection Switching
