= OTN =

OTN may refer to:

- OTN1, a Canadian television channel
- Open Transport Network, a specific ring-based telecommunication network architecture
- Optical transport network, a telecommunication network standards framework for optical networks
- Oracle Technology Network, the official online/offline community for Oracle technical professionals
- Ed-Air Airport – Oaktown, Indiana, United States (IATA code: OTN)
