= Network bridge =

Device that creates a larger computer network from two smaller networks

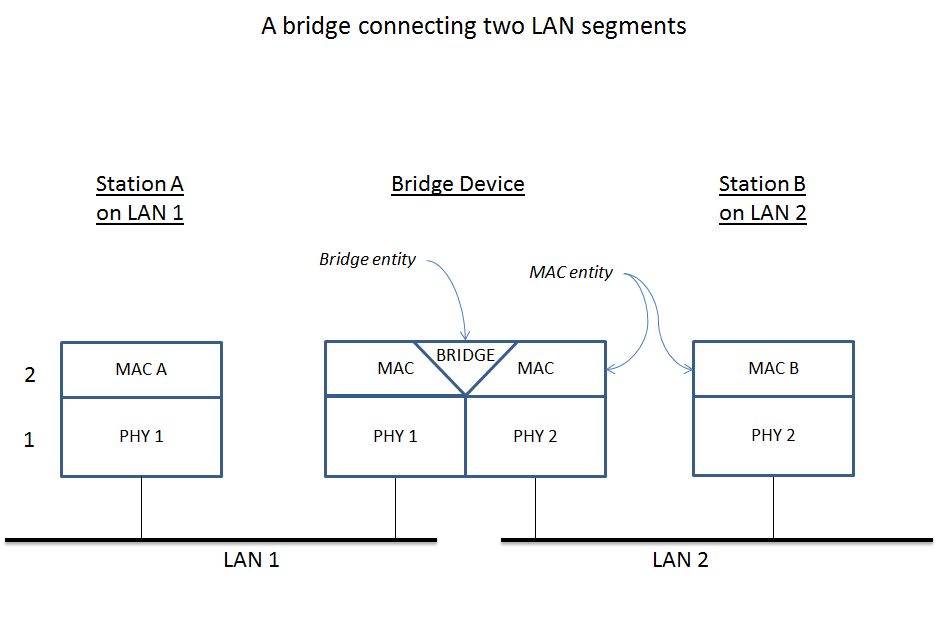
A high-level overview of network bridging, using the ISO/OSI layers and terminology

A network bridge is a computer networking device that creates a single, aggregate network from multiple communication networks or network segments. This function is called network bridging. Bridging is distinct from routing. Routing allows multiple networks to communicate independently and yet remain separate, whereas bridging connects two separate networks as if they were a single network. In the OSI model, bridging is performed in the data link layer (layer 2). If one or more segments of the bridged network are wireless, the device is known as a wireless bridge.

The main types of network bridging technologies are simple bridging, multiport bridging, and learning or transparent bridging.

== Transparent bridging ==
Transparent bridging uses a table called the forwarding information base to control the forwarding of frames between network segments. The table starts empty and entries are added as the bridge receives frames. If a destination address entry is not found in the table, the frame is forwarded to all other ports of the bridge, flooding the frame to all segments except the one from which it was received. By means of these flooded frames, a host on the destination network will respond and a forwarding database entry will be created. Both source and destination addresses are used in this process: source addresses are recorded in entries in the table, while destination addresses are looked up in the table and matched to the proper segment to send the frame to. Digital Equipment Corporation (DEC) originally developed the technology in 1983 and introduced the LANBridge 100 that implemented it in 1986.

In the context of a two-port bridge, the forwarding information base can be seen as a filtering database. A bridge reads a frame's destination address and decides to either forward or filter. If the bridge determines that the destination host is on another segment on the network, it forwards the frame to that segment. If the destination address belongs to the same segment as the source address, the bridge filters the frame, preventing it from reaching the other network where it is not needed.

Transparent bridging can also operate over devices with more than two ports. As an example, consider a bridge connected to three hosts, A, B, and C. The bridge has three ports. A is connected to bridge port 1, B is connected to bridge port 2, C is connected to bridge port 3. A sends a frame addressed to B to the bridge. The bridge examines the source address of the frame and creates an address and port number entry for host A in its forwarding table. The bridge examines the destination address of the frame and does not find it in its forwarding table so it floods (broadcasts) it to all other ports: 2 and 3. The frame is received by hosts B and C. Host C examines the destination address and ignores the frame as it does not match with its address. Host B recognizes a destination address match and generates a response to A. On the return path, the bridge adds an address and port number entry for B to its forwarding table. The bridge already has A's address in its forwarding table so it forwards the response only to port 1. Host C or any other hosts on port 3 are not burdened with the response. Two-way communication is now possible between A and B without any further flooding to the network. Now, if A sends a frame addressed to C, the same procedure will be used, but this time the bridge will not create a new forwarding-table entry for A's address/port because it has already done so.

Bridging is called transparent when the frame format and its addressing aren't changed substantially. Non-transparent bridging is required especially when the frame addressing schemes on both sides of a bridge are not compatible with each other, e.g. between ARCNET with local addressing and Ethernet using IEEE MAC addresses, requiring translation. However, most often such incompatible networks are routed in between, not bridged.

== Simple bridging ==
A simple bridge connects two network segments, typically by operating transparently and deciding on a frame-by-frame basis whether or not to forward from one network to the other. A store and forward technique is typically used so, as part of forwarding, the frame integrity is verified on the source network and CSMA/CD delays are accommodated on the destination network. In contrast to repeaters which simply extend the maximum span of a segment, bridges only forward frames that are required to cross the bridge. Additionally, bridges reduce collisions by creating a separate collision domain on either side of the bridge.

== Multiport bridging ==
A multiport bridge connects multiple networks and operates transparently to decide on a frame-by-frame basis whether to forward traffic. Additionally, a multiport bridge must decide where to forward traffic. Like the simple bridge, a multiport bridge typically uses store and forward operation. The multiport bridge function serves as the basis for network switches.

== Implementation ==
The forwarding information base stored in content-addressable memory (CAM) is initially empty. For each received Ethernet frame the switch learns from the frame's source MAC address and adds this together with an interface identifier to the forwarding information base. The switch then forwards the frame to the interface found in the CAM based on the frame's destination MAC address. If the destination address is unknown the switch sends the frame out on all interfaces (except the ingress interface). This behavior is called unicast flooding.

== Forwarding ==
Once a bridge learns the addresses of its connected nodes, it forwards data link layer frames using a layer-2 forwarding method. There are four forwarding methods a bridge can use, of which the second through fourth methods were performance-increasing methods when used on switch products with the same input and output port bandwidths:

1. Store and forward: the switch buffers and verifies each frame before forwarding it; a frame is received in its entirety before it is forwarded.
2. Cut through: the switch starts forwarding after the frame's destination address is received. There is no error checking with this method. When the outgoing port is busy at the time, the switch falls back to store-and-forward operation. Also, when the egress port is running at a faster data rate than the ingress port, store-and-forward is usually used.
3. Fragment free: a method that attempts to retain the benefits of both store and forward and cut through. Fragment free checks the first 64 bytes of the frame, where addressing information is stored. According to Ethernet specifications, collisions should be detected during the first 64 bytes of the frame, so frame transmissions that are aborted because of a collision will not be forwarded. Error checking of the actual data in the packet is left for the end device.
4. Adaptive switching: a method of automatically selecting between the other three modes.

== Bridge loops ==
If network bridges are connected in a way that forms redundant paths or mesh loops, broadcast frames loop through the network indefinitely, bringing it to a halt. This situation must be mitigated using a spanning tree protocol or a more intelligent forwarding algorithm like Shortest Path Bridging or TRILL.

=== Spanning tree protocol ===
A spanning tree protocol is a distributed algorithm that organizes active ports in way to form a spanning tree, where there is only one usable path between any two nodes.

=== Shortest Path Bridging ===
Shortest Path Bridging (SPB), specified in the IEEE 802.1aq standard and based on Dijkstra's algorithm, is a computer networking technology intended to simplify the creation and configuration of networks, while enabling multipath routing. It is a proposed replacement for Spanning Tree Protocol which blocks any redundant paths that could result in a switching loop. SPB allows all paths to be active with multiple equal-cost paths. SPB also increases the number of VLANs allowed on a layer-2 network.

TRILL (Transparent Interconnection of Lots of Links) is the successor to Spanning Tree Protocol, both having been created by the same person, Radia Perlman. The catalyst for TRILL was an event at Beth Israel Deaconess Medical Center which began on 13 November 2002. The concept of Rbridges [sic] was first proposed to the Institute of Electrical and Electronics Engineers in the year 2004, who in 2005 rejected what came to be known as TRILL, and in the years 2006 through 2012 devised an incompatible variation known as Shortest Path Bridging.

== See also ==
- Audio Video Bridging – Specifications for synchronized, low-latency streaming
- IEEE 802.1D – Standard which includes bridging, Spanning Tree Protocol and others
- IEEE 802.1Q – IEEE networking standard supporting VLANs
- IEEE 802.1ah-2008 – Standard for bridging over a provider's network
- Promiscuous mode – Network interface controller mode that eavesdrops on messages intended for others
