= Dynamic Packet Transport =

Dynamic Packet Transport (DPT) is a Cisco transport protocol designed for use in optical fiber ring networks. In overview, it is quite similar to POS and DTM. It was one of the major influences on the Resilient Packet Ring/802.17 standard.

== Protocol design ==
DPT is implemented as two counter-rotating rings. This means the network is composed of two completely separate rings of fiber that are both able to transmit data concurrently. This design provides for redundancy in case of a fiber cut or link failure, and increased throughput in common situations. DPT as opposed to POS or normal SONET/SDH is able to use both rings at the same time whereas POS only uses one ring under normal circumstances but switches to the second upon failure of the first. Cisco claims that DPT can run with double the bit-rate of POS due to this characteristic. DPT is not a PPP whereas POS is, this means that traffic between two nodes of a DPT ring does not affect intermediate nodes. With the introduction of DPT came the introduction of another Cisco developed MAC layer protocol, Spatial Reuse Protocol or SRP. The use of SRP in conjunction with DPT makes it possible for DPT to communicate with the physical layer.

== Types of data in DPT networks ==
As with most other lower layer protocols, there are methods for communicating not only application data between the nodes of a DPT network. It is necessary for the nodes to be able to communicate control data between each other in case of a fiber cut or link failure so the nodes can forward traffic on the appropriate interfaces and maintain network connectivity. Both control packets, and data packets are transmitted on both rings in order to maintain connectivity and full bandwidth utilization in normal situations; but once a failure occurs, the control data will notify the applicable routers of the failure and all the routers will switch to using only their active interfaces for data and control packets.

== DPT packet structure ==
The structure of a DPT Packet is quite similar to that of Ethernet. It contains a source and destination MAC address (both 48-bits long), a protocol type identifier (used for identifying the upper layer protocol contained in the payload), and a frame check sequence used to validate the data.

== DPT topologies ==
Both DPT and SRP are independent of their physical layers. This means that the DPT protocol can operate above several physical mediums such as SONET/SDH, Gigabit Ethernet, and others. As aforementioned, DPT is composed of two rings for fault tolerance and increased throughput. The method for switching between these two rings in the event of a failure is called Intelligent Protection Switching, or IPS. This ensures that a fiber cut or link failure (layer 1 error) will be rectified and IP traffic will be resumed within 50 ms. DPT also contains a "plug and play" feature which dynamically fetches the MAC addresses of neighboring devices which provides for very simple configuration with little to no setup prior to functional data transfer.
