= Adaptive switching =

Automatic selection between cut-through and store-and-forward modes

An adaptive switch is a network switch designed to normally operate in cut-through mode. If a port's error rate jumps too high, the switch automatically reconfigures the port to run in store-and-forward mode. This optimizes the switch's performance by providing lower delay cut-through switching if error rates are low, but higher throughput store-and-forward switching when error rates are high.

Adaptive switching mode decisions are typically made on a port-by-port basis.
