= Stofor =

Store and forward message switching system

Stofor systems undergoing final test

Stofor, pronounced as in "Stow Four", is a store and forward message switching system designed by Fenwood Designs Ltd, UK in 1980.

== Market and specification ==
Stofor was aimed squarely at the bottom end of the market and its competitors were from companies such as Chernikeeff (now John Lilley and Gillie Ltd) and Racal but Stofor was soon outselling both with ease. The Stofor range was based on a 4 MHz Zilog Z80 processor with 64K RAM and provided from 4 to 64 ports. Early models, and some later ones, were floppy disk based but later and larger versions had 10Mb Winchester technology hard disks for storage. Stofor was the only message switching system of its size to boast a custom text editor designed by Fenwood with the needs of the telex user in mind. Its main workload was in the sending and receiving of telex messages but it was also put to work in a wide range of other communications areas including fax.

The initial design was for a system that would replace a London commodity broker's antiquated telex room, containing 12 telex machines, with a computer for sending and receiving messages plus a number of VDUs (computer displays) for preparing and editing messages. The resulting Stofor system was an instant hit and many orders were placed when the broker's associates and competitors saw the system in operation. Additional options such as direct input from dedicated word processors, leased line working and several other features were soon requested and incorporated.

== Users ==
Stofor became very popular in the City of London and was in use by banks, shipping brokers, commodity traders and insurance companies. Digital Equipment Corporation used one as the centre of its European message distribution network in Reading and others were in use by a number of household names in the food, chemical and engineering industries. Several were supplied to INMARSAT to provide telex links via satellite for ships at sea, and to the Lockheed subsidiary Memrykord, who provided international flight-planning services.

== Manufacture ==
When Stofor was born, Fenwood employed about six staff but this grew rapidly until there were forty eight, covering all aspects such design, procurement, production, software writing, sales and customer support. Sadly, with the rapid growth of fax and then the advent of email, demand for message switching systems such as Stofor died away and Fenwood moved into other markets, finally being wound up in the late 1990s. During their 'lives' Fenwood and Stofor were based in Farncombe, Godalming, Guildford; all in Surrey, UK and in Aldershot, Hampshire, UK.

== Designers ==
Stofor was the result of work by Fenwood's three directors: John Kashel, Sales and marketing director, who came up with the concept and basic specification; Bob Fearnley, Technical Director, who designed the hardware and Tom Grainger, Software Director, who wrote the software. The original software for the product had been written by a third party but, as they let Fenwood down badly on delivery dates, Tom Grainger completed the job and eventually rewrote all the software in-house.

== See also ==
- Fax
- Network switch
- Store and forward delay
- Store-and-forward switching center
