= IEEE 802.1D =

Standard which includes bridging, Spanning Tree Protocol and others

IEEE 802.1D is the Ethernet MAC bridges standard which includes bridging, Spanning Tree Protocol and others. It is standardized by the IEEE 802.1 working group. It includes details specific to linking many of the other 802 projects including the widely deployed 802.3 (Ethernet), 802.11 (Wireless LAN) and 802.16 (WiMax) standards.

Bridges using virtual LANs (VLANs) have never been part of 802.1D, but were instead specified in separate standard, 802.1Q originally published in 1998.

By 2014, all the functionality defined by IEEE 802.1D has been incorporated into either IEEE 802.1Q-2014 (Bridges and Bridged Networks) or IEEE 802.1AC (MAC Service Definition). 802.1D is expected to be officially withdrawn in 2022.

Publishing history:

- 1990 — Original publication (802.1D-1990).
- 1993 — standard ISO/IEC 10038:1993.
- 1998 — Revised version (802.1D-1998, ISO/IEC 15802-3:1998), incorporating the extensions P802.1p, P802.12e, 802.1j-1996 and 802.6k-1992.
- 2004 — Revised version (802.1D-2004), incorporating the extensions 802.11c-1998, 802.1t-2001, 802.1w-2001, and removing the original Spanning Tree Protocol, instead incorporating the Rapid Spanning Tree Protocol (RSTP) from 802.1w-2001.
- Amendments to 802.1D-2004:
  - 2004 — Small amendment (802.17a-2004) to add in 802.17 bridging support.
  - 2007 — Small amendment (802.16k-2007) to add in 802.16 bridging support.
- 2012 — Shortest Path Bridging (IEEE 802.1aq-2012, amendment to 802.1Q-2011).

== See also ==
- Multiple Spanning Tree Protocol
- Spanning Tree Protocol
- TRILL – Transparent Interconnection of Lots of Links
