= Open Transport Network =

Open Transport Network (OTN) is a flexible private communication network based on fiber optic technology, manufactured by OTN Systems.

It is a networking technology used in vast, private networks with a great diversity of communication requirements, such as subway systems, pipelines, the mining industry, tunnels and the like (ref). It permits all kinds of applications such as video images, different forms of speech and data traffic, information for process management and the like to be sent flawlessly and transparent over a practically unlimited distance. The system is a mix of Transmission and Access NE, communicating over an optical fiber. The communication protocols include serial protocols (e.g. RS232) as well as telephony (POTS/ISDN), audio, Ethernet, video and video-over-IP (via M-JPEG, MPEG2/4, H.264 or DVB) (ref).

Open Transport Network is a brand name and not to be mistaken with Optical Transport Network.

== Concept ==
The basic building block of OTN is called a node. It is a 19" frame that houses and interconnects the building blocks that produce the OTN functionality. Core building blocks are the power supply and the optical ring adapter (called BORA : Broadband Optical Ring Adapter) (ref). The remaining node space can be configured with up to 8 (different) layer 1 interfaces as required.

OTN nodes are interconnected using pluggable optical fibers in a dual counterrotating ring topology. The primary ring consists of fibers carrying data from node to node in one direction, the secondary ring runs parallel with the primary ring but carries data in the opposite direction. Under normal circumstances, only one ring carries active data. If a failure is detected in this data path, the secondary ring is activated. This hot standby topology results in a 1 + 1 path redundancy. The switchover mechanism is hardware based and results in ultrafast (50ms) switchover without service loss.

Virtual bidirectional point-to-point or point-to-multipoint connections (services) between identical interfaces in different nodes are programmed via a configuration software called OMS (OTN management system). By doing this, OTN mimics a physical wire harness interconnecting electronic data equipment but with the added advantages typical for fiber transmission and with high reliability due to the intrinsic redundant concept.

This concept makes the Open Transport Network the de facto transmission backbone standard for industrial high reliability communication sites that require errorfree communication for a large spectrum of protocols over long distances like pipelines, metros, rail, motorways and industrial sites.

The optical rings transport frames with a bitrate of (approximately) 150 Mbit/s (STM-1/OC-3), 622 Mbit/s (STM-4/OC-12), 2.5 Gbit/s (STM-16/OC-48) or 10 Gbit/s (STM-64/OC-192). The frames are divided into 32 kb payload cells that carry the service data from source to destination. Via the OTN management system (OMS), as many cells as required by the service are allocated to connections. This bandwidth allocation is transferred to the non-volatile memory of the control boards of the nodes. As a result, the network is able to start up and work without the OMS connected or on line.
