= Dermatopontin =

Protein found in humans

DPT

Identifiers
- Aliases: DPT, TRAMP, dermatopontin
- External IDs: OMIM: 125597; MGI: 1928392; GeneCards: DPT

Gene location (Human)
Chr.	Chromosome 1 (human)
Band	1q24.2	Start	168,695,468 bp
Band	1q24.2	End	168,729,206 bp

Gene location (Mouse)
Chr.	Chromosome 1 (mouse)
Band	1|1 H2.2	Start	164,624,213 bp
Band	1|1 H2.2	End	164,651,835 bp
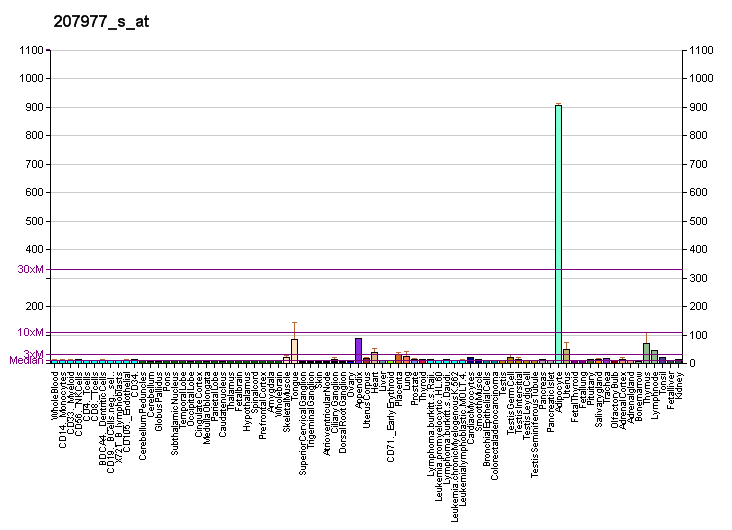

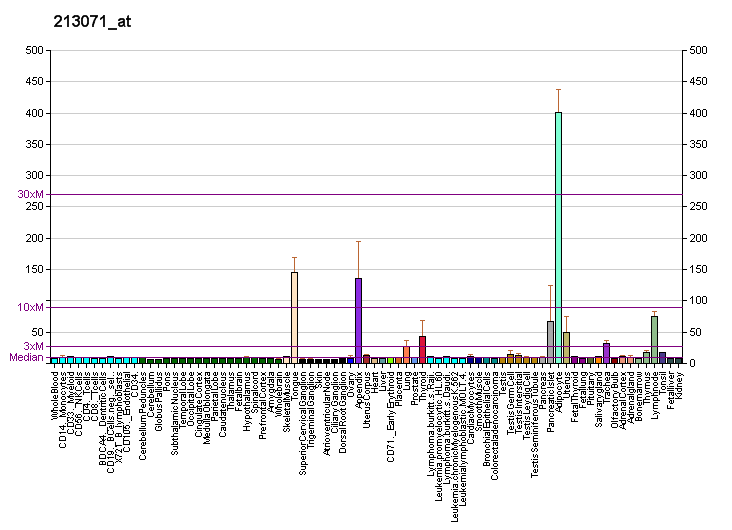

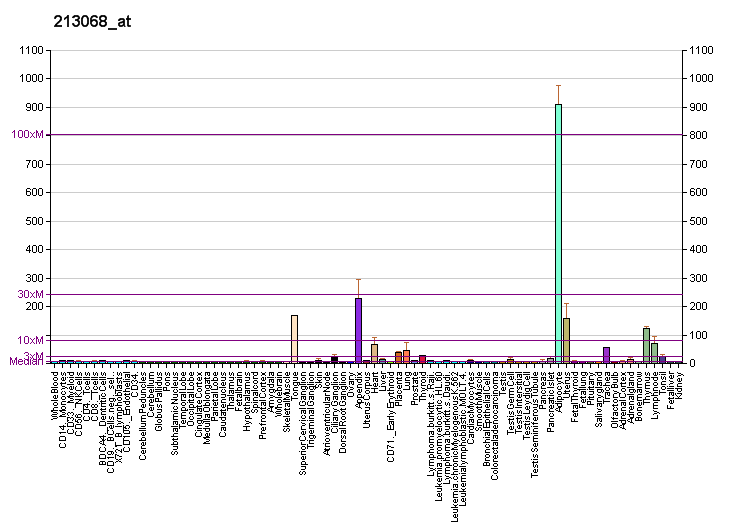
RNA expression pattern
Bgee	Human / Mouse (ortholog); Top expressed in: smooth muscle tissue; muscle layer of sigmoid colon; epithelium of colon; right auricle of heart; subcutaneous adipose tissue; lactiferous gland; left uterine tube; gallbladder; gastric mucosa; fundus / Top expressed in: semi-lunar valve; aortic valve; cervix; subcutaneous adipose tissue; intercostal muscle; skin of abdomen; carotid body; ankle; ascending aorta; white adipose tissue; More reference expression data
BioGPS	More reference expression data
Gene ontology
Molecular function	extracellular matrix structural constituent; protein binding
Cellular component	extracellular matrix; extracellular region; extracellular exosome; extracellular space; collagen-containing extracellular matrix
Biological process	cell adhesion; negative regulation of cell population proliferation; collagen fibril organization
Sources:Amigo / QuickGO
Orthologs
Databases	NCBI: entry; OMA: entry
Species	Human	Mouse
Entrez	1805	56429
Ensembl	ENSG00000143196	ENSMUSG00000026574
UniProt	Q07507	Q9QZZ6
RefSeq (mRNA)	NM_001937	NM_019759
RefSeq (protein)	NP_001928	NP_062733
Location (UCSC)	Chr 1: 168.7 – 168.73 Mb	Chr 1: 164.62 – 164.65 Mb
PubMed search
- Wikidata
View/Edit Human	View/Edit Mouse

Dermatopontin also known as tyrosine-rich acidic matrix protein (TRAMP) is a protein that in humans is encoded by the DPT gene. Dermatopontin is a 22-kDa protein of the noncollagenous extracellular matrix (ECM) estimated to comprise 12 mg/kg of wet dermis weight. To date, homologues have been identified in five different mammals and 12 different invertebrates with multiple functions. In vertebrates, the primary function of dermatopontin is a structural component of the ECM (interaction with decorin and modification of collagen fibrillogenesis), cell adhesion, modulation of TGF-β activity and cellular quiescence). It also has pathological involvement in heart attacks (increased expression around myocardial infarct zone) and decreased expression in leiomyoma and fibrosis. In invertebrate, dermatopontin homologue plays a role in hemagglutination, cell–cell aggregation, and expression during parasite infection.

== Cellular and tissue distribution ==
Dermatopontin is expressed in the extracellular matrix (ECM), which is a gel-like fluid space outside of a cell that consists of collagen fibers, elastin fibers, glycoproteins, and proteoglycans (1). The components of the ECM are connected to proteins embedded in the plasma membrane of cells. These membrane proteins perform many functions, including transporting materials, serving as enzymes for chemical reactions, transmitting cell signals, and intercellular junction (1).

Dermatopontins are expressed primarily in fibroblasts, heart tissue, skeletal muscle, brain and pancreas. They occur less frequently in lungs and kidneys, and much less frequently in fibroblasts from hypertrophic scar lesional skin and in fibroblasts from patients with systemic sclerosis than in normal skin fibroblasts (3).

In the skin, DPT is found in the collagen fibers and also in the cytoplasm of cultured fibroblasts.” DPT has also been found in the cornea, specifically the stroma.

The protein is found in various tissues and many of its tyrosine residues are sulphated.

== Function ==
Dermatopontin is a component of the intercellular junction that holds membranes of adjacent cells together (2). The components of the ECM are connected to proteins embedded in the plasma membrane, which in turn are connected to the internal cytoskeleton of the cell. These connections also facilitate cell-to-cell communication (1).

Dermatopontin mediates adhesion by cell surface integrin binding and accelerates collagen fibril formation that determines the size and arrangement of collagen fibrils within the extracellular matrix (2). Other functions of dermatopontin include stabilizing collagen fibrils against low temperature dissociation, inhibiting cell proliferation, enhancing TGFB1 activity, and possibly serving as a communication link between the dermal fibroblast cell surface and its extracellular environment (3).

Dermatopontin itself is a noncollagenous ECM protein but it facilitates collagen binding (2).

Dermatopontin is an extracellular matrix protein with possible functions in cell-matrix interactions and matrix assembly. The extracellular matrix (ECM) is known as a non-cellular component that is found in all organs and tissues. The ECM provides not only a physical scaffolding for individual cells, but also biomechanical communication between cells that is required for morphogenesis, differentiation and homeostasis. One of the major roles of Dermatopontin includes its ability to promote cell adhesion. Since DPT is a proteoglycan binding protein, this helps in the adhesion between fibroblasts and keratinocytes. Dermatopontin (DPT) has a high expression of dermis and is part of the non-collagenous matrix. DPT also has an important role in activating transforming growth factor beta 1 (TGF-β1). TGF-β1 has an important role in wound healing.

Re-epithelialization is also an important part of healing wounds. Both DPT and re-epithelialization depend on the migration of the epidermal keratinocytes and the many different growth factors that are located within the extracellular matrix. DPT was found able to aid in the migration of keratinocytes, but failed in the ability to induce cellular proliferation. The keratinocytes are epidermal cells that help with the production of keratin, which is a fibrous protein that can be found in hair, feathers, and hooves.

In the skin, DPT is found in the collagen fibers and also in the cytoplasm of cultured fibroblasts.” DPT has also been found in the cornea, specifically the stroma.

Dermatopontin is postulated to modify the behavior of TGF beta through interaction with decorin.

=== Cell adhesion ===
Cell adhesion is the effect of the cell behavior due to the function of the dermatopontin. Even though, cell adhesion activity of dermatopontin is not strong for a certain fibroblasts and neurogenic cells, but it might have various roles in wound healings because dermatopontin has been found in a provisional matrix that interacted with fibrin and fibronectin (Fn) which has improved the cell adhesion activity of Fn. A provisional matrix is forms of extravasated blood after the wounding, which compose of the wound fluid, fibrin and Fn. In the provisional matrix, the Fn perform as an adhesion and migration structure to provide support all around the ECM for fibroblasts and circulation-derived cells, while in tissues, Fn perform as an activated and collected into the Fn matrix (a fibrillar structure) that discovered during both development of embryonic and wound healing. Dermatopontin has been found in the provisional matrix as well as in the wound fluid, and it has demonstrated that dermatopontin promoted Fn fibril formation that biologically functions in the dermal wound healing, and the presence of dermatopontin has enhanced the Fn interaction with fibrin as well as the enhancement of cell adhesion, which indicated the morphological changed of the cells that has been adhered to the complex. Dermatopontin determined to be found in the interaction sites of Fn on III_13 and III_14 and cryptic site of III_1, which all involved in formation of Fn fibrils, and the inhibition of dermatopontin were considering to be between III_(2-3) and III_(12-14) because dermatopontin was not enhanced the interaction between III_(1-5) and III_(1-2), which could be the domains unfold as the disruption of the other interdomain interactions. In this case, dermatopontin indicated as domain unfolding of a Fn molecule due to the binding site for anastellin (the only known protein that induce superfibronectin formation) on Fn is located between III_(2-3) and III_(12-14) inside the interaction site, which is the important binding site for the Fn fibril formation. Therefore, dermatopontin is protein within the ECM that could activate Fn and induce Fn fibril formation, which could help in wound healing due to its accumulation in the wound whether from the ECM's surrounded or from the serum.

== Applications ==
Dermatopontin plays a key role in interactions of the cell matrix and its assembly that can in turn induce cellular apoptosis. In the osteosarcoma MG-63 cell line, silencing the DPT gene decreased the proliferation of the MG-63 cells.

DPT, along with lumican and decorin, is a biomarker for giant-cell tumor of bone (GCTB).

There is also a relationship between CCW (chronic cutaneous wound) and the DPT gene. The healing of CCW can be inhibited through the destruction of some matrix proteins, such as DPT and low levels of DTP expression slows the rate of healing.

DPT is also a biomarker for OSCC (oral squamous cell carcinoma) as well. It was shown that OSCC cells had a suppressed response to DPT. DPT expression had an inverse relationship with cellular adhesion, and a direct relationship with its invasiveness.
