= Store and forward =

Telecommunications technique

Store and forward is a telecommunications technique in which a digital data stream is sent to an intermediate station where it is kept in digital storage and sent at a later time to the final destination or to another intermediate station. The intermediate station, or node in a networking context, verifies the integrity of the message before forwarding it. In general, this technique is used in networks with intermittent connectivity, especially in the wilderness or environments requiring high mobility. It may also be preferable in situations when there are long delays in transmission and error rates are variable and high, or if a direct, end-to-end connection is not available.

== Modern store and forward networking ==
- Store and forward originates with delay-tolerant networks. No real-time services are available for these kinds of networks.
- Logistical Networking is a scalable form of store-and-forward networking that exposes network-embedded buffers on intermediate nodes and allows flexible creation of services by higher-level managers, including caching, point-to-multipoint communication (or multicast), content delivery and many other stateful distributed services. Real-time services can be created using logistical networking when data transfer connectivity permits.

A store-and-forward switching center is a message switching center in which a message is accepted from the originating user, i.e., sender, when it is offered, held in a physical storage, and forwarded to the destination user, i.e., receiver, in accordance with the priority placed upon the message by the originating user and the availability of an outgoing channel.

Store-and-forward switching centers are usually implemented in mobile service stations, where the messages that are sent from the sender are first sent to these centers. If the destination address isn't available, then the center stores this message and tries sending it later. This improves the probability of the message being delivered. In the other case, if the destination is available at that time, then the message is immediately sent.

== Manually operated relay ==
Store-and-forward networks predate the use of computers. Point-to-point teleprinter equipment was used to send messages, which were stored at the receiving end on punched paper tape at a relay center. A human operator at the center removed the message tape from the receiving machine, read the addressing information, and then sent it toward its destination on the appropriate outbound point-to-point teleprinter link. If the outbound link was in use, the operator placed the message tape in a physical queue, usually consisting of a set of clips or hooks. A major relay center in the mid-1900s might have dozens of inbound and outbound teleprinters, scores of operators, and thousands of messages in the queues during peak periods. Operators referred to these centers as "torn-tape relay centers", a reference to removing the received message from the inbound teleprinter by tearing the paper tape to separate one message from the next. The U.S. military term for such a center was "Non-Automated Relay Center" (NARC).

== Automatic relay ==
In 1948, Western Union introduced Plan 55-A, the first automatic electromechanical store-and-forward message switching system. All message storage was performed by paper tape punches paired with paper tape readers, with a bin in between.

== Email ==
It is very common for an email system using SMTP to accept a message, store it and then forward it on elsewhere. Although fully open mail relays are no longer common, not only does simple server-based forwarding work this way, but also many email filtering and automated electronic mailing lists services.

== SMS ==
SMS messages are first sent to a Short Message service center where they are stored temporarily before being forwarded to the intended recipient's phone, even if they are not currently reachable, allowing for delivery later when they come back online.

== UUCP ==
Prior to the deployment of the Internet, computers were connected via a variety of point-to-point techniques, with many smaller computers using dial-up connections. The UUCP store-and-forward protocols allowed a message (typically e-mail) to move across the collection of computers and eventually reach its destination. Late in the 20th century, store-and-forward techniques evolved into packet switching, which replaced them for most purposes.

== FidoNet ==
FidoNet was an email store-and-forward system for bulletin board systems that peaked at 45,000 systems with millions of users across the world. The system was highly efficient, using the latest file compression and file transfer systems to aggressively drive down the cost of transmission on what was largely a hobby network. The system was later modified to support public messages (forums) called EchoMail, which grew to about 8 MB a day, compressed.

== See also ==
- Best-effort delivery
- Cut-through switching
- Delay-tolerant networking
- Email forwarding
- Forward secrecy § Non-interactive forward secrecy
- Fragment free
- Hop-by-hop transport
- Internet fax
- Logistical Networking
- Network switch
- Packet radio
- Stofor
- Store and forward delay
- Wormhole routing
