= Unicast =

Sending a message to one computer; on a one-to-one basis

Unicast is data transmission from a single sender (red) to a single receiver (green). Other devices on the network (yellow) do not participate in the communication.

Routing schemes
Unicast

Broadcast

Multicast

Anycast

In computer networking, unicast is a one-to-one transmission from one point in the network to another point; that is, one sender and one receiver, each identified by a network address.

Unicast is in contrast to multicast and broadcast which are one-to-many transmissions.

Internet Protocol unicast delivery methods such as Transmission Control Protocol (TCP) and User Datagram Protocol (UDP) are typically used.

== See also ==
- Anycast
- Broadcast, unknown-unicast and multicast traffic
- IP address
- IP multicast
- Routing
