= Ethernet Automatic Protection Switching =

Ethernet fault-tolerance technique

Ethernet Automatic Protection Switching (EAPS) is used to create a fault tolerant topology by configuring a primary and secondary path for each VLAN.

Invented by Extreme Networks and submitted to IETF as RFC3619. The idea is to provide highly available Ethernet switched rings (commonly used in Metro Ethernet) to replace legacy TDM based transport protection fiber rings. Other implementations include Ethernet Protection Switching Ring (EPSR) by Allied Telesis which enhanced EAPS to provide full protected transport of IP Triple Play services (voice, video and internet traffic) for xDSL/FTTx deployments. EAPS/EPSR is the most widely deployed Ethernet protection switching solution deployed with major multi-vendor inter-operability support. The EAPS/EPSR are the basis of the ITU G.8032 Ethernet Protection recommendation.

== Operation ==
A ring is formed by configuring a Domain. Each domain has a single "master node" and many "transit nodes". Each node will have a primary port and a secondary port, both known to be able to send control traffic to the master node. Under normal operation, the secondary port on the master is blocked for all protected vlans.

When there is a link down situation, the devices that detect the failure send a control message to the master, and the master will then unblock the secondary port and instruct the transits to flush their forwarding databases. The next packets sent by the network can then be flooded and learned out of the (now enabled) secondary port without any network disruption.

Fail-over times are demonstrably in the region of 50ms.

The same switch can belong to multiple domains and thus multiple rings. However, these act as independent entities and can be controlled individually.

== EAPS v2 ==
EAPSv2 is configured and enabled to avoid the potential of super-loops in environments where multiple EAPS domains share a common link. EAPSv2 works using the concept of a controller and partner mechanism. Shared port status is verified using health PDUs exchanged by controller and partner. When a shared link goes down, the configured Controller will open only one segment port for each of the protected VLANs, keeping all other segment ports in a blocking state. This state is maintained as long as the Controller fails to receive the health PDUs over the (broken) shared link.

Although not supported by Extreme Networks, it is possible to complete this shared link with non-EAPS (but tag-aware) switches between the Controller and Partner.

When the shared link is restored, the Controller can then unblock its ports, the masters will see their hello packets, and the rings will be protected by their respective masters.

== See also ==
- Rapid Spanning Tree Protocol
- Ethernet Ring Protection Switching
