= Ethernet Ring Protection Switching =

ITU-T Ethernet specification

Ethernet Ring Protection Switching (ERPS) is an effort at ITU-T under G.8032 Recommendation to provide sub-50ms protection and recovery switching for Ethernet traffic in a ring topology and at the same time ensuring that there are no loops formed at the Ethernet layer. This ITU-T specification is directly based on and derived from the Ethernet Automatic Protection Switching technology developed and patented by Extreme Networks. G.8032v1 supported a single ring topology and G.8032v2 supports multiple rings/ladder topology.

== Overview ==
ERPS specifies protection switching mechanisms and a protocol for Ethernet layer network (ETH) rings. Ethernet Rings can provide wide-area multipoint connectivity more economically due to their reduced number of links. The mechanisms and protocol defined in this Recommendation achieve highly reliable and stable protection; and never form loops, which would fatally affect network operation and service availability.

Each Ethernet Ring Node is connected to adjacent Ethernet Ring Nodes participating in the same Ethernet Ring, using two independent links. A ring link is bounded by two adjacent Ethernet Ring Nodes, and a port for a ring link is called a ring port. The minimum number of Ethernet Ring Nodes in an Ethernet Ring is three.

The fundamentals of this ring protection switching architecture are:

- The principle of loop avoidance.
- The utilization of learning, forwarding, and Filtering Database (FDB) mechanisms defined in the Ethernet flow forwarding function (ETH_FF).

Loop avoidance in an Ethernet Ring is achieved by guaranteeing that, at any time, traffic may flow on all but one of the ring links. This particular link is called the Ring Protection Link (RPL), and under normal conditions this ring link is blocked, i.e. not used for service traffic. One designated Ethernet Ring Node, the RPL Owner Node, is responsible for blocking traffic at one end of the RPL. Under an Ethernet ring failure condition, the RPL Owner Node is responsible for unblocking its end of the RPL (unless the RPL has failed) allowing the RPL to be used for traffic. The other Ethernet Ring Node adjacent to the RPL, the RPL Neighbour Node, may also participate in blocking or unblocking its end of the RPL.

The event of an Ethernet Ring failure results in protection switching of the traffic. This is achieved under the control of the ETH_FF functions on all Ethernet Ring Nodes. An APS protocol is used to coordinate the protection actions over the ring.

=== G.8032v2 ===
Version 2 of G.8032 introduced many additional features, such as:

- Multi-ring/ladder network support
- Revertive/ Non-revertive mode after the condition that is causing the switch has been cleared
- Administrative commands: Forced Switch (FS), Manual Switch (MS) for blocking a particular ring port
- Flush FDB (Filtering database) Logic, which significantly reduces amount of flush FDB operations in the ring
- Support of multiple ERP instances on a single ring

== Principle of operation ==
=== G.8032v1 ===
In ERPS there is a central node called RPL Owner Node which blocks one of the ports to ensure that there is no loop formed for the Ethernet traffic. The link blocked by the RPL owner node is called the Ring Protection Link or RPL. The node at the other end of the RPL is known as RPL Neighbor Node. It uses R-APS control messages to coordinate the activities of switching on/off the RPL link.

Any failure along the ring triggers a R-APS (SF) (R-APS signal fail) message along both directions from the nodes adjacent to the failed link after these nodes have blocked the port facing the failed link. On obtaining this message, RPL owner unblocks the RPL port. (Note that a single link failure anywhere in the ring ensures a loop free topology.)

During the recovery phase when the failed link gets restored the nodes adjacent to the restored link send R-APS (NR) (R-APS no request) messages. On obtaining this message, the RPL owner blocks the RPL port and then sends a R-APS(NR, RB) (R-APS no request, RPL blocked) message. This will cause all other nodes other than RPL owner in the ring to unblock all the blocked ports.

This protocol is robust enough to work for unidirectional failure and multiple link failure scenarios in a ring topology. It includes a mechanism to force switch (FS) or manual switch (MS) which is used in field maintenance scenarios.

== See also ==
- Ethernet Automatic Protection Switching
