= Point coordination function =

802.11-based WLAN medium access control method

Point Coordination Function (PCF) is a media access control (MAC) technique used in IEEE 802.11 based WLANs, including Wi-Fi. It resides in a point coordinator also known as access point (AP), to coordinate the communication within the network. The AP waits for PIFS duration rather than DIFS duration to grasp the channel. PIFS is less than DIFS duration and hence the point coordinator always has the priority to access the channel.

The PCF is located directly above the distributed coordination function (DCF), in the IEEE 802.11 MAC Architecture. Channel access in PCF mode is centralized and hence the point coordinator sends CF-Poll frame to the PCF capable station to permit it to transmit a frame. In case the polled station does not have any frames to send, then it must transmit null frame. Due to the priority of PCF over DCF, stations that only use DCF might not gain access to the medium. To prevent this, a repetition interval has been designed to cover both (Contention free) PCF & (Contention Based) DCF traffic. The repetition interval which is repeated continuously, starts with a special control frame called Beacon Frame. When stations hear the beacon frame, they start their network allocation vector for the duration of the contention free period of the repetition period.

Since most APs have logical bus topologies (they are shared circuits) only one message can be processed at one time (it is a contention based system), and thus a media access control technique is required.

Wireless networks may suffer from a hidden node problem where some regular nodes (which communicate only with the AP) cannot see other nodes on the extreme edge of the geographical radius of the network because the wireless signal attenuates before it can reach that far. Thus having an AP in the middle allows the distance to be halved, allowing all nodes to see the AP, and consequentially, halving the maximum distance between two nodes on the extreme edges of a circle-star topology.

PCF seems to be implemented only in very few hardware devices as it is not part of the Wi-Fi Alliance's interoperability standard.

== PCF Interframe Space ==
PCF Interframe Space (PIFS) is one of the interframe space used in IEEE 802.11 based Wireless LANs. PCF enabled access point wait for PIFS duration rather than DIFS to occupy the wireless medium. PIFS duration is less than DIFS and greater than SIFS (DIFS > PIFS > SIFS). Hence AP always has more priority to access the medium.

PIFS duration can be calculated as follows:

PIFS = SIFS + Slot time

Standard	Slot time (μs)	PIFS (μs)
IEEE 802.11-1997 (FHSS)	50	78
IEEE 802.11-1997 (DSSS)	20	30
IEEE 802.11b	20	30
IEEE 802.11a	9	25
IEEE 802.11g	9 or 20	19 or 30
IEEE 802.11n (2.4 GHz)	9 or 20	19 or 30
IEEE 802.11n (5 GHz)	9	25
IEEE 802.11ac	9	25

== See also ==
- Contention free pollable
- Distributed Coordination Function
- Hybrid Coordination Function
- DIFS
- Short Interframe Space
- Arbitration inter-frame spacing
- Reduced Interframe Space
- Extended Interframe Space
