= Network allocation vector =

Virtual carrier-sensing mechanism in wireless networking

The network allocation vector (NAV) is a virtual carrier-sensing mechanism used with wireless network protocols such as IEEE 802.11 (Wi-Fi) and IEEE 802.16 (WiMax). The virtual carrier-sensing is a logical abstraction which limits the need for physical carrier-sensing at the air interface in order to save power. The MAC layer frame headers contain a duration field that specifies the transmission time required for the frame, in which time the medium will be busy. The stations listening on the wireless medium read the Duration field and set their NAV, which is an indicator for a station on how long it must defer from accessing the medium.

The NAV may be thought of as a counter, which counts down to zero at a uniform rate. When the counter is zero, the virtual carrier-sensing indication is that the medium is idle; when nonzero, the indication is busy. The medium shall be determined to be busy when the station (STA) is transmitting. In IEEE 802.11, the NAV represents the number of microseconds the sending STA intends to hold the medium busy (maximum of 32,767 microseconds). When the sender sends a Request to Send the receiver waits one SIFS before sending Clear to Send. Then the sender will wait again one SIFS before sending all the data. Again the receiver will wait a SIFS before sending ACK. So NAV is the duration from the first SIFS to the ending of ACK. During this time the medium is considered busy.

Wireless stations are often battery-powered, so to conserve power the stations may enter a power-saving mode. A station decrements its NAV counter until it becomes zero, at which time it is awakened to sense the medium again.

The NAV virtual carrier sensing mechanism is a prominent part of the CSMA/CA MAC protocol used with IEEE 802.11 WLANs. NAV is used in DCF, PCF and HCF.
