= 802.11 non-standard equipment =

Equipment extending the Wi-Fi standards with proprietary technology

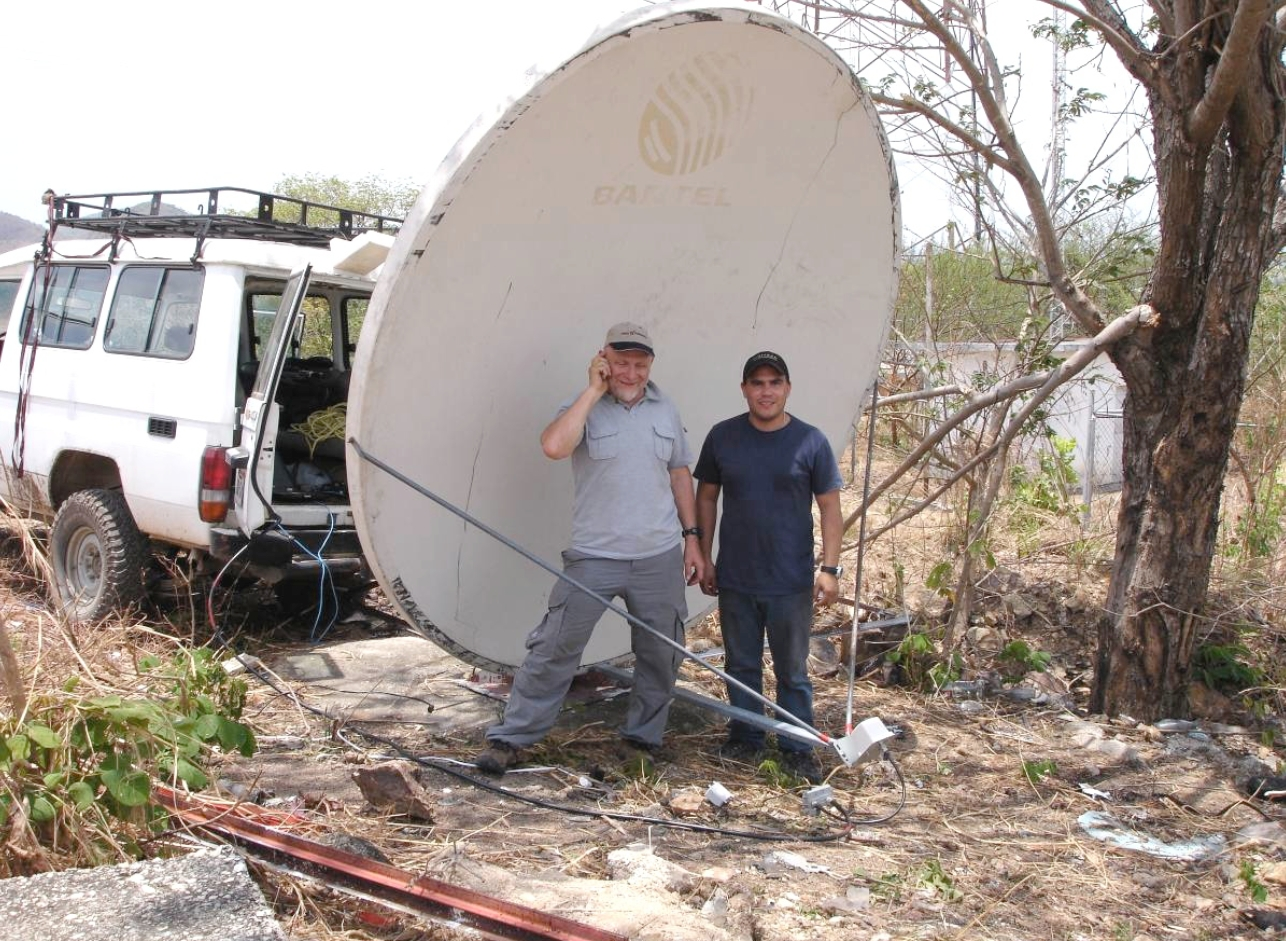
Large retired satellite dish used for long-range Wi-Fi connection in Venezuela

802.11 non-standard equipment is equipment that seeks to extend the Wi-Fi standard 802.11, by implementing proprietary features.

== Channel bonding ==
Chipmaker Atheros sells a proprietary channel bonding feature called Super G for manufacturers of access points and client cards. This feature can boost network speeds up to 108 Mbit/s by using channel bonding. Also range is increased to 4x the range of 802.11g and 20x the range of 802.11b. This feature may interfere with other networks and may not support all b and g client cards. In addition, packet bursting techniques are also available in some chipsets and products which will also considerably increase speeds. This feature may not be compatible with other equipment.

== Compression ==
Broadcom, another chipmaker, developed a competing proprietary frame-bursting feature called "125 High Speed Mode" or Linksys "SpeedBooster", in response to criticism of Super G's interference potential.

USRobotics also had a "MAXg" line of wireless products boasting 125 Mbit/s (actual throughput 35 Mbit/s) and about a 75% increase in signal range from the 802.11g standard. Based on tests performed by KeyLabs on March 23, 2005 the MAXg series consistently outperformed the equivalent proprietary solutions and some of the "Draft 802.11n" solutions from other developers; more than one year before commercially available "pre N" or "Draft N" adapters.

== TDMA and polling ==
Various vendors implement proprietary TDMA polling modes, including Ligowave iPoll2/iPoll3, Mikrotik Nstreme/Nv2, and Ubiquiti airMAX. Such modes are generally incompatible with each other, nor with standard 802.11 clients.

These modes are frequently used for long-range dedicated links and/or by wireless Internet service providers, as they by design avoid the hidden node problem present in regular (CSMA/CD) Wi-Fi links.
