= DCF Interframe Space =

The IEEE 802.11 family of standards describe the DCF protocol, which controls access to the physical medium. A station must sense the status of the wireless medium before transmitting. If it finds that the medium is continuously idle for DCF Interframe Space (DIFS) duration, it is then permitted to transmit a frame. If the channel is found busy during the DIFS interval, the station should defer its transmission.

DIFS duration can be calculated by the following method.

DIFS = SIFS + (2 * Slot time)

Standard	Slot time (μs)	DIFS (μs)
IEEE 802.11-1997 (FHSS)	50	128
IEEE 802.11-1997 (DSSS)	20	50
IEEE 802.11b	20	50
IEEE 802.11a	9	34
IEEE 802.11g	9 or 20	28 or 50
IEEE 802.11n (2.4 GHz)	9 or 20	28 or 50
IEEE 802.11n (5 GHz)	9	34
IEEE 802.11ac (5 GHz)	9	34

IEEE 802.11g is backward compatible with IEEE 802.11b. When these devices are associated with same AP all the timing parameters are changed to 802.11b.

== See also ==
- SIFS
- PIFS
- AIFS
- RIFS
- EIFS
- DCF
