= Xpress technology =

Xpress technology is Broadcom's standards-based frame-bursting approach to improve 802.11 wireless LAN performance. It is a software-based implementation of the frame-bursting originally in the IEEE 802.11e draft specification, and is found in the Wireless Multimedia Extensions (WME) specification. It is not only designed to improve network efficiency but also boost throughput speeds of 802.11g and is particularly successful in mixed environments with 802.11a/b/g networks. It is one of the early enhancement technologies designed for 802.11 but it was preceded by Intersil's Prism Nitro and Atheros' Super G. Nitro was able to improve speed 3 times while Xpress posted 6 times improvement in mixed mode condition.
