= RSNE =

Robust Security Network Element (RSNE) is an info element that may exist in 802.11 Beacon frames indicating a security network that allows only the creation of robust security network associations (RSNAs), and that the group cipher suite specified is not wired equivalent privacy (WEP).
