= Traffic indication map =

Traffic indication map (TIM) is a structure used in IEEE 802.11 wireless network management frames.

The traffic indication map information element is covered under section 7.3.2.6 of 802.11-1999 standard.

The IEEE 802.11 standards use a bitmap to indicate to any sleeping listening stations that the access point (AP) has buffered data waiting for it. Because stations should listen to at least one beacon during the listen interval, the AP periodically sends this bitmap in its beacons as an information element. The bit mask is called the traffic indication map and consists of 2008 bits, each bit representing the association ID (AID) of a station.

However, in most situations an AP only has data for a few stations, so only the portion of the bitmap representing those stations needs to be transmitted.

Because the bitmap is never transmitted in its entirety, it is referred to as a virtual bitmap, and the portion that is actually transmitted is referred to as a partial virtual bitmap.

The structure of the TIM is as follows:

element ID	length	DTIM count	DTIM period	bitmap control		partial virtual bitmap
element ID	length	DTIM count	DTIM period	offset	broadcast	partial virtual bitmap

element ID
(1 octet)
identifies a TIM element
length
(1 octet)
the size of the whole element (5 to 255)
DTIM_count
(1 octet)
the number of beacons remaining before a DTIM (including this frame, so 0 means that this frame is a DTIM)
DTIM_period
(1 octet)
A scaling factor indicating that only every nth beacon includes a TIM. Stations in low-power mode will remain asleep and only wake to listen for those beacons, to determine whether they should also remain awake to receive data frames.
bitmap_control.offset
(7 bits)
bitmap_control.broadcast
(1 bit)
1 when one or more broadcast or multicast frames are queued. This means that all stations should wake up.
partial_virtual_bitmap
(8 to 2008 bits)
This comprises (length-4)×8 bits, each representing a currently-associated station. The low-order bit of the first octet represents station with association ID (bitmap_control.offset×16). Bits outside the partial bitmap are implicitly zero.

== Delivery traffic indication message ==
A delivery traffic indication message (DTIM) is a kind of TIM which informs the clients about the presence of buffered multicast or broadcast data on the access point. It is generated within the periodic beacon at a frequency specified by the DTIM interval. Beacons are packets sent by an access point to synchronize a wireless network. Normal TIMs that are present in every beacon are for signaling the presence of buffered unicast data. After a DTIM, the access point will send the buffered multicast and broadcast data on the channel following the normal channel access rules (CSMA/CA). This helps to have minimum collision and, in effect, increased throughput. In cases where there is not much interference, or where the number of clients is limited, the DTIM interval has little or no significance.

=== 802.11 standard ===
According to the 802.11 standards, a delivery traffic indication message (DTIM) period value is a number that determines how often a beacon frame includes a DTIM, and this number is included in each beacon frame. A DTIM is included in beacon frames, according to the DTIM period, to indicate to the client devices whether the access point has buffered broadcast or multicast data waiting for them. Following a beacon frame that includes a DTIM, the access point will release the buffered broadcast and multicast data, if any exists.

Since beacon frames are sent using the mandatory 802.11 algorithm for carrier-sense multiple access with collision avoidance (CSMA/CA), the access point must wait if a client device is sending a frame when the beacon is to be sent. As a result, the actual time between beacons may be longer than the beacon interval. Client devices that awaken from power-save mode may find that they have to wait longer than expected to receive the next beacon frame. Client devices, however, compensate for this inaccuracy by utilizing the time stamp found within the beacon frame.

The 802.11 standards define a power-save mode for client devices. In power-save mode, a client device may choose to sleep for one or more beacon intervals, waking for beacon frames that include DTIMs. When the DTIM period is 2, a client device in power-save mode will awaken to receive every other beacon frame. Upon entering power-save mode, a client device will transmit a notification to the access point, so that the access point will know how to handle unicast traffic destined for the client device. The client device will begin to sleep according to the DTIM period.

=== DTIM period ===
The higher the DTIM period, the longer a client device may sleep and therefore the more power a particular client device may save.

Client devices in wireless networks may have conflicting requirements for power consumption and communication throughput when in power-save mode. For example, laptop computers may require relatively high communication throughput and may have low sensitivity to power consumption. Therefore, a relatively low DTIM period, for example 1, may be suitable for these devices. Pocket devices, however, may require relatively low communication throughput and may be operated by batteries of relatively low capacity. Therefore, a higher DTIM period, for example 8, may be suitable for pocket devices. But some of these have a medium to high communication throughput, while still having small batteries, so would benefit from a medium DTIM period, such as 4.

In the present standards, an access point is able to store only a single DTIM period. Consequently, different client devices in power-save mode will all wake up for the same beacon frames according to the DTIM period. A network manager may need to balance the conflicting requirements for power consumption and communication throughput when in power-save mode of client devices in different wireless networks when configuring the DTIM period of an access point. In the future, an access point that can serve multiple service sets (multiple SSIDs) may have a separate DTIM period for each service set. A network manager may consider the requirements of power consumption and communication throughput of client devices in a particular wireless network when determining which DTIM period to configure for which service set. A higher DTIM period may increase the potential savings in power consumption but reduce the communication throughput, and vice versa.

== Bibliography ==
- "Power Savings on IEEE-802.11". wireless.wiki.kernel.org.
- Röhl, Ch.; Woesner, H.; Wolisz, A. (1997). "A Short Look on Power Saving Mechanisms in the Wireless LAN Standard Draft IEEE 802.11". IEEE 802.11. In the 6th WINLAB Workshop on Third Generation Wireless Systems, NewBrunswick, NJ: 183–188.
- "Advanced wireless settings". DD-WRT Wiki. 2012.
- Bhagat, Raseel (2009). "WiFi Demystified – Part I". Techie Buzz.
