= WNM =

WNM may refer to:

== Science and technology ==
- Warm Neutral Medium, a component of the interstellar medium of the Milky Way
- West Nile meningitis, a neurological disease caused by the West Nile virus
- Wireless Network Management, of the IEEE 802.11v standard

== Military ==
- Washington Naval Militia, a defunct military reserve of the United States Navy
- Wisconsin Naval Militia, a defunct military reserve of the United States Navy

== Other uses ==
- Writers News Manitoba, the former name of the Canadian literary magazine Prairie Fire
- Weston Milton railway station (Station code), a railway station in Weston-super-Mare, North Somerset, England
- Windsor station (Vermont) (Station code), a train station in Windsor, Vermont, United States
- Wednesday Night Memorial Social Club, Venice, California, United States
