= Super G (disambiguation) =

Super G is a racing discipline of alpine skiing.

Super G may also refer to:

- Super G (wireless networking), Atheros' proprietary enhancements to IEEE 802.11g wireless LAN performance
- Super G is also a brand formerly used by Giant Food of Landover, Maryland
- Lockheed L-1049G Super Constellation, a propeller driven airliner often referred to as the "Super G"
