= WMM =

WMM may refer to:

- Well-Manicured Man, a character in The X-Files
- West Midlands Metro, a light-rail/tram system in West Midlands, England
- Wide Mouth Mason, a Canadian blues-rock band
- Windows Movie Maker, a video editing software package, and file format extension
- Wi-Fi Multimedia or Wireless Multimedia Extensions (WME), a QoS implementation
- Women Make Movies, an organization for women film-makers
- World Magnetic Model, a digital model of the Earth's geomagnetic field
- World Marathon Majors, championship style marathon competition
