= PIFS =

PIFS may refer to:

- Pacific Islands Forum
- Public information film
- PCF Interframe Space
- partitioned iterated function system, used in fractal compression
