= Contention free pollable =

Wireless networking state of operation

Contention-free pollable (CF-Pollable) is a state of operation for wireless networking nodes. The condition is saying that the node is able to use the Point Coordination Function, as opposed to the Distributed Coordination Function, within a wireless LAN.

A device that is able to use point coordination function is one that is able to participate in a method to provide limited Quality of service (for time sensitive data) within the network.

== See also ==
- Contention (telecommunications)
