= IEEE 802.11d-2001 =

WiFi specification

IEEE 802.11d-2001 is an amendment to the IEEE 802.11 specification that adds support for "additional regulatory domains". This support includes the addition of a country information element to beacons, probe requests, and probe responses. The country information elements simplifies the creation of 802.11 wireless access points and client devices that meet the different regulations enforced in various parts of the world. The amendment has been incorporated into the published IEEE 802.11-2012 standard.

802.11d is a wireless specification for operation in additional regulatory domains. This supplement to the 802.11 specifications defines the physical layer requirements:

- Channelization
- Hopping patterns
- New values for current MIB attributes
- Future requirements to extend the operation of 802.11 WLANs to new regulatory domains (countries).

The current 802.11 standard defines operation in only a few regulatory domains (countries). This supplement adds the requirements and definitions necessary to allow 802.11 WLAN equipment to operate in markets not served by the current standard. These are anything other than Americas or FCC, Europe or ETSI, Japan, China, Israel, Singapore, Taiwan.

As of January 1, 2015, the U.S. Federal Communications Commission ruled that new devices are not allowed to rely solely on 802.11d for setting country-specific radio parameters.
