= EDCA =

EDCA may refer to:

- Enhanced Defense Cooperation Agreement, a mutual defense agreement between the United States and the Philippines
- Enhanced Distributed Channel Access, an operation mode of IEEE 802.11e-2005
- United States District Court for the Eastern District of California (E.D.Ca.)
- Escadron de détection et de contrôle aéroporté, a French Air and Space Force aircraft squadron
