= Fujitsu Ltd. v. Netgear Inc. =

2010 U.S. patent infringement lawsuit

Fujitsu Limited v. Netgear Inc.
- Court: United States Court of Appeals for the Federal Circuit
- Full case name: Fujitsu Limited and L.G Electronics and U.S. Philips Corporation v. Netgear Inc.
- Decided: September 20 2010
- Citations: 620 F.3d 1321; 96 U.S.P.Q.2d 1742

Case history
- Prior history: 576 F. Supp. 2d 964 (W.D. Wis. 2008)

Holding
- Non-infringement in two patents. Infringement of the third patent in four specific models.

Court membership
- Judges sitting: Alan David Lourie, Daniel Mortimer Friedman, Kimberly Ann Moore

Case opinions
- Majority: Kimberly Ann Moore

Laws applied
- 35 U.S.C. § 271, 35 U.S.C. § 287

Fujitsu Ltd. v. Netgear Inc., 620 F.3d 1321 (Fed. Cir. 2010), was a patent infringement case centered on three patents claimed to be required for full compliance of the IEEE 802.11 (WiFi) standard and the WiFi Alliance Wireless Multimedia Extensions (WMM) Specification. US patents 4,975,952, 6,018,642, and 6,469,993 were owned by Philips Electronics, Fujitsu, and LG Electronics respectively, and placed in the Via Licensing pool. The Via Licensing pool claimed to hold all patents required for a complete WiFi/WMM implementation. Netgear did not enter an agreement with Via Licensing but produced a series of products that conform to the WiFi standard and WMM Specification. Philips Electronics, Fujitsu, and LG Electronics sued Netgear for patent infringement claiming a complete implementation of the WiFi standard implied violating patents held by Via Licensing pool. When tried in United States District Court for the Western District of Wisconsin, the court granted summary judgment of non-infringement by Netgear for all three patents thus plaintiffs appealed. The United States Court of Appeals for the Federal Circuit confirmed non-infringement for two of the three patents and found infringement of the third patent in four of Netgear's products.

== Background ==
Fujitsu, LG Electronics, and Philips Electronics were participating in the Via licensing pool and hold US patents 6,018,642, 6,469,993 and 4.974,952 respectively that were claimed to be required for complete implementation of the IEEE 802.11 (WiFi) standard and the WiFi Alliance Wireless Multi-Media (WMM) Specification. Via licensing Pool sent letters several times from 2005 to 2007 to Netgear noticing that its products that were compliant with the 802.11 standard had infringed patents included in the licensing pool. However, Netgear's request that Via Licensing Pool inform specifically which of its products infringed which portions of those patents was ignored and Netgear didn't accept its suggestion on licensing. On December 17, 2007, Plaintiffs sued Netgear for patent infringement and Netgear did seek summary judgment for noninfringement.

== Specific issue in this case ==
=== Standard patent ===
Plaintiffs' suit was based upon the theory that "networks conforming with IEEE standard also conformed to the patent in suit". Stated simply, plaintiffs attempted to prove infringement by Netgear's products by showing that those products that practice WiFi standard and WMM Specification necessarily infringe three patents in suit. The district court pointed out that the central issue here is whether mere implementation of WiFi standard by Netgear's products made Netgear automatically liable for infringement of patents placed in the licensing pool related to the 801.11 standard and related Specification.

=== Grouping ===
Throughout the trial, plaintiffs adhered to the strategy to group the accused products when providing evidence of infringement. Plaintiffs argued that grouping of products when submitting evidence was proper based on their expert's testimony saying that "different versions of the same product will typically support the same feature set". However, the district court was very careful to accept the evidence based on the grouping strategy, explaining that plaintiffs' argument that three separate patents had been infringed by more than 260 products of Netgear made it not easy to prove which components of which allegedly infringing products actually infringed which portions of the three patents.

== Opinion of The district court and The court of appeals ==
The District Court for Western District of Wisconsin (The district court) denied all of the three motions for summary of judgment filed by plaintiffs and granted motion for summary judgment of non-infringement by Netgear.

=== Analysis of the Courts on US patent 952 ===
==== Patent claim analysis (Clarification of the terms used in claim) ====
US patent 4,975,952 claims a method of transmitting data in a wireless network, specifically fragmenting large messages into smaller messages to avoid resending large amounts of data if network transmission errors occur and, thus, to transfer data more reliably.

==== Patent infringement analysis by the district court ====
Phillips urged that Netgear indirectly infringed its patents and was liable for contributory infringement. First, with respect to the indirect infringement, the district court concluded that Netgear could not indirectly infringe plaintiff's patent since there were no evidence that the patent is directly infringed by the third parties. The court acknowledged that end users could enable fragmentation through software control and therefore might infringed the patents at issue. However, because fragmentation is merely an optional component of the IEEE 802.11 specification and Netgear products did not enable fragmentation by default, the court could not find any explicit circumstantial evidences that third parties indeed infringed the 952 patent.

Second, the district court decided that Netgear did not contribute to the infringement. To prove the contributory infringement by Netgear, plaintiff submitted the notice letters sent by Via Licensing pool to Netgear as evidence that Netgear had recognized that it infringed the 952 patent. However, the district court held "the notice letters sent by Philips prior to the instant suit were not sufficient to establish the knowledge and intent elements of contributory and induced infringement". In addition, the district court stated the initial notice of patent infringement was not sufficient to establish Netgear's knowledge of infringtement.

The district court denied the summary of motion for infringement and granted Netgear's summary of motion for non-infringement.

==== Judgment by the Court of Appeals for the Federal Circuit ====
The federal court of appeals referenced 35 U.S.C. § 271 to determine contributory infringement. Specifically, the patent owner must show: "1) that there is direct infringement, 2) that the accused infringer had knowledge of the patent, 3) that the component has no substantial non-infringing uses, and 4) that the component is a material part of the invention". To determine direct infringement, the court stated "if an accused product operates in accordance with a standard, then comparing the claims to that standard is the same as comparing the claims to the accused product"; however, the court softend their statement with the following "We acknowledge, however, that in many instances, an industry standard does not provide the level of specificity required to establish that practicing that standard would always result in infringement". However, Netgear's customer service records that had recommended end-users enable fragmentation on four models (WPN111, WG511, WPN824, and WG311T) was accepted as a viable evidence. The appeal court, thus, agreed with the district court that Philips failed to establish a genuine issue of material fact regarding direct infringement for all but the four models with corresponding customer service records.

The court decided Philip's notices of infringement provided Netgear sufficient knowledge of infringement. Likewise, the court could not find substantial non-infringing uses of wireless fragmentation. When considering material part of invention, the district court claimed defragmentation did not infringe US patent 4,975,952 as it only made material claims of fragmentation techniques. Weighing all four elements of direct infringement, the federal court reversed the district court's summary judgment for non-infringement Netgear's models WPN111, WG511, WPN824, and WG311T.

In addition, the federal court overruled the district court's limitation on damages. 35 U.S.C. § 287 allows limited damages when a patent holder uses their claimed invention without clearly marking the product with the relevant patent number. The federal court held the district court was in error as 35 U.S.C. § 287 does not apply to any patent directed a method and US patent 4,975,952 explicitly claimed a method for fragmentation.

=== Analysis of the Courts on US patent 642 ===
==== Patent claim analysis (Clarification of the terms used in claim) ====
The second patent under consideration in this case is US patent 6,018,642, owned by Fujitsu. The patent under consideration claimed "a system for reducing power consumption in mobile devices that access wireless networks". In the 642 patent, to save the energy consumption, the mobile station's wireless communication subsystem is configured to only power up in time to receive the beacon signals noticing that there is data to transfer and if no data is available, immediately power off. The idea behind this patent is to keep the wireless radio in a low-power state as much as possible to preserve energy.

===== Meaning of "Synchronous" =====
There were especially two terms used in claims in the 642 patents that required clarification. In both the district and circuit court, potential infringement centered on the definition of "synchronous". In Fujitsu's patent, the function of the alert beacon signal is described as "an intermittent power-on type mobile station for shift to a power-on state synchronously with a received timing of a beacon signal, with a fixed period of time after the beacon signal has been received being defined as a data receive-ready period". The district court construed the phrase "shifting to a power on state synchronously with a received timing of a beacon signal" to mean "shifting to a power-on state at the same time a beacon signal is to be received.

===== Meaning of "Fixed period of time" for Data Receive-Ready (DRR) period =====
Also, one of the claim in the 642 patent described that data receive-ready(DRR) period is " a fixed period of time during which an intermittent power-on type mobile station is in its power on state and prepared to receive data, with the period beginning immediately after the intermittent power-on type mobile station receives the beacon signal telling it there is data to be transmitted to it". The issue here was what exactly the fixed period of time means. The court held that the DRR period must have a fixed length for the Netgear's devices to infringe the 642 patent.

==== Patent infringement analysis by the district court ====
The district court stated that the jury could not find that the device literally infringed the "synchrnously" element of the 642 patent, because it was impossible to know from plaintiffs' oscilloscope graphs (one of the evidence submitted by plaintiff) the precise time between when defendant's accused mobile devices reach their power-on mode and when a beacon signal is to be received.

Also, the district court allowed Fujitsu's expert witness to demonstrate a WiFi system configured to transmit an alert signal every 102 milliseconds. The district court reported that the Netgear system remained on as long as a "more data" flag or the alert beacon was enabled. If the beacon was inactive or the "more data" flag was not set, the system immediately powered down. This proved Netgear's system does not have a fixed data receive-ready period.

==== Judgment by the court of appeals for the federal circuit ====
During the appeal, Fujitsu claimed "synchronously" does not mean "at the same time". Instead, Fujitsu stated "synchronously" means: "the shifting to a power-on state has a temporal relationship with the beacon signal so that the beacon signal can be received." In addition, Fujitsu argued that the district court's definition of "synchronous" would require two events to occur at precisely the same time which they stated is a physical impossibility. Netgear argued the district court's interpretation was correct. The circuit court defined synchronous to mean "just before or at the same time" and thereby slightly relax the limitation. Given the evidence from the district court's experiment, however, the circuit court affirmed the district court's grant of summary judgment of non-infringement without modification.

=== Analysis of the courts on US patent 993 ===
==== Patent claim analysis (Clarification of the terms used in claim) ====
The final patent under consideration is 6,469,993 owned by LG Electronics. This patent described a system for quality of service in a communications network where the base station assigns priority to different clients and traffic types. Specifically, the LG patent grants individual terminals priority levels. Here, the important fact is that the priority to determine which data would be received first is assigned at the terminal level.

==== Patent infringement analysis by the district court ====
LG electronics argued that Netgear products that implemented WMM Specification infringed its 993 patents. The WMM Specification is a complement to the 802.11 standard that outlines a set of structures and methods to ensure better quality of service within an 802.11 compliant network. However, the district court held that the accused products did not infringe the patent because the WMM Specification states that priority is assigned to message types, but not to individual terminals as described in the 993 patent.

==== Judgment by the court of appeals for the federal circuit ====
The appeals court affirmed the district court's judgment of non-infringement for US patent 6,469,993.

== Holding by the court of appeals for the federal circuit ==
The appeals court decided on September 20, 2010, that Netgear was not liable for infringement of US patents 6,018,642 and 6,469,993. Infringement of US patent 4,975,952 occurred in the four specific models for which Netgear's consumer support records recommended enabling packet fragmentation.
