= Nitro (wireless networking) =

Proprietary performance enhancement technology

Nitro from Conexant (originally developed by Intersil) is a proprietary 802.11g performance enhancement technology introduced in 2003 as part of the PRISM chipset. The first implementation was designed to help compensate for the performance loss of higher-speed 802.11g devices when they share a wireless network with slower 802.11b devices.

Later implementations are marketed as Nitro MX Xtreme which adds proprietary frame-bursting, compression and point-to-point side session technology for a claimed 140 Mbit/s throughput transmission speed. The point-to-point side session technology, called DirectLink, creates a connection between clients or from a client to a media source, such as a media server, and avoids the access point. It does this while staying in 802.11 Infrastructure mode so the client can continue to utilize access point-based security and power-savings.

== Alternatives ==
Nitro is one of several competing incompatible proprietary extension approaches that were developed to increase performance of 802.11g wireless devices, such as 125 High Speed Mode from Broadcom, Super G (or "108 Mbit/s" technology) from Atheros, and MIMO-based extensions from Airgo Networks.

== See also ==
- Proprietary protocol
- Vendor lock-in
