= IEEE 802.11c =

Older IEEE standard on wireless bridging

IEEE 802.11c is an amendment to the IEEE 802.1D MAC bridging standard to incorporate bridging in wireless bridges or access points. This work is now part of IEEE 802.1D-2004.

802.11c was ratified in October 1998 and is a supplement to IEEE 802.1D that adds requirements associated with bridging 802.11 wireless client devices. In particular it adds a sub clause under 2.5 Support of the Internal Sublayer Service, to cover bridge operations with 802.11 MACs.

== See also ==
- IEEE 802.11
- Network bridge
- Spanning Tree Protocol
- Wi-Fi
