= IEEE 802.11ai =

International standard

IEEE 802.11ai is a Wireless LAN standard from IEEE that since June 2017 provides fast initial link setup (FILS) methods that enable a wireless LAN client to achieve a secure link setup within 100ms, designed to improve dense environments. FILS provides fast roaming without 802.11r.

The Intel wireless daemon IWD in Linux added support for FILS in May 2019.

A denial-of-service attack has been reported for 802.11ai.
