= Inter-Access Point Protocol =

International standard

Inter-Access Point Protocol or IEEE 802.11F is a recommendation that describes an optional extension to IEEE 802.11 that provides wireless access point communications among multivendor systems. 802.11 is a set of IEEE standards that govern wireless networking transmission methods. They are commonly used today in their 802.11a, 802.11b, 802.11g and 802.11n versions to provide wireless connectivity in the home, office and some commercial establishments.

The IEEE 802.11 standard doesn't specify the communications between access points in order to support users roaming from one access point to another and load balancing. The 802.11 working group purposely did not define this element in order to provide flexibility in working with different wired and wireless distribution systems (i.e., wired backbones that interconnect access points).

== Protocol operation ==
The protocol is designed for the enforcement of unique association throughout an Extended Service Set and for secure exchange of station's security context between the current Access Point (AP) and the new AP during the handoff period. Based on security level, communication session keys between Access Points are distributed by a RADIUS server. The RADIUS server also provides a mapping service between AP's MAC address and IP address.

== Status ==
The 802.11F Recommendation has been ratified and published in 2003.

IEEE 802.11F was a Trial Use Recommended Practice. The IEEE 802 Executive Committee approved its withdrawal on February 3, 2006.

== See also ==
- IEEE 802.11k Radio Resource Management
- IEEE 802.11r Fast roaming
