= Contention (telecommunications) =

Channel access method

In statistical time division multiplexing, contention is a media access method that is used to share a broadcast medium. In contention, any computer in the network can transmit data at any time (first come, first served).

This system breaks down when two computers attempt to transmit at the same time. This is known as a collision. To avoid collisions, a carrier sensing mechanism is used. Here, each computer listens to the network before attempting to transmit. If the network is busy, it waits until the network quiets down. In carrier detection, computers continue to listen to the network as they transmit. If a computer detects another signal that interferes with the signal it is sending, it stops transmitting. Both computers then wait for a random amount of time and attempt to transmit. Contention methods are most popular media access control method on LANs.

== Collision detection and recovery ==
One method to handle collisions in a contention-based system is to optimize collision detection and subsequent recovery.

- A collision can be detected by listening to the shared medium immediately after transmitting and identifying collision characteristics; or by capturing data from the medium and performing error detection.
- For recovery, some systems simply cause senders to re-transmit collided data (perhaps with backing-off algorithms which reduce the sender's re-transmit rate when collisions keep occurring) or use Error Correction techniques such as FEC.

== Collision avoidance ==
An alternative method to handle collisions in a contention-based system is to attempt to avoid them. Some systems may utilize a strict scheduling guideline to identify who may use which resources when. Other systems may have the senders listen to the channel immediately prior to transmitting and determine suitable times to transmit.

== Common examples ==
Collisions are a condition that arises when two or more data stations attempt to transmit at the same time over a shared channel, or when two data stations attempt to transmit at the same time in a half duplex communication link. A contention-based channel access (multiple access) protocol is a protocol where data packet collisions may occur. Examples of such protocols are:

- The Aloha protocol
- Carrier Sense Multiple Access (CSMA)
- Multiple Access with Collision Avoidance

== Other examples ==
In telecommunication, the term contention also has the following less usual meanings:

- Competition by users of a system for use of the same facility at the same time. This may also be known as oversubscription. The term contention ratio applies specifically to the number of people connected to an ISP who share a set amount of bandwidth. Typical values would be 50:1 for home users (that is to say that 50 people or lines will vie for the same bandwidth) and 20:1 for business users. It is for this reason that the shortfall between supplier-claimed access speeds and those experienced by the consumer once signed-up to a contract is particularly bad at just those times when most consumers actually want to use the service.
- A contention can occur in data communications when no station is designated a master station. In contention, each station must monitor the signals and wait for a quiescent condition before initiating a bid for master status.

== See also ==
- Contention free pollable
