= IEEE 802.11v-2011 =

Wireless networking standard

IEEE 802.11v is an amendment to the IEEE 802.11 standard to allow configuration of client devices while connected to wireless networks. It was published as 802.11v-2011 and later incorporated into 802.11-2012.

802.11 is a set of IEEE standards that govern wireless networking transmission methods. They are commonly used today in their 802.11a, 802.11b, 802.11g, 802.11n, and 802.11ac versions to provide wireless connectivity in the home, office and commercial establishments.

== Wireless Network Management ==
802.11v is the Wireless Network Management standard for the IEEE 802.11 family of standards. 802.11v allows client devices to exchange information about the network topology, including information about the RF environment, making each client network-aware, facilitating overall improvement of the wireless network.

802.11v describes enhancements to wireless network management, such as:

- Network assisted Power Savings - Helps clients to improve battery life by enabling them to sleep longer. For example, mobile devices use a certain amount of idle period to ensure that they remain connected to access points and therefore consume more power when performing the following tasks in a wireless network.
- Network assisted Roaming - Enables the WLAN to send messages to associated clients, for better APs to associate with clients. This is useful for both load balancing and in directing poorly connected clients.

== Status ==
After several years in development as a draft standard, 802.11v was ratified as a formal amendment to the 802.11 standard on 2 February 2011. Its content was later moved to the next edition of the main standard in 802.11-2012.

== See also ==
- IEEE 802.11F
- IEEE 802.11k
- IEEE 802.11r
