= Short Interframe Space =

Time gap between transmissions in wireless networking

Short Interframe Space (SIFS), is the amount of time in microseconds required for a wireless interface to process a received frame and to respond with a response frame. It is the difference in time between the first symbol of the response frame in the air and the last symbol of the received frame in the air. A SIFS time consists of the delay in receiver RF, PLCP delay and the MAC processing delay, which depends on the physical layer used. In IEEE 802.11 networks, SIFS is the interframe spacing prior to transmission of an acknowledgment, a Clear To Send (CTS) frame, a block ack frame that is an immediate response to either a block ack request frame or an A-MPDU, the second or subsequent MPDU of a fragment burst, a station responding to any polling a by point coordination function and during contention free periods of point coordination function.

Standard	SIFS (μs)
IEEE 802.11-1997 (FHSS)	28
IEEE 802.11-1997 (DSSS)	10
IEEE 802.11b	10
IEEE 802.11a	16
IEEE 802.11g	10
IEEE 802.11n (2.4 GHz)	10
IEEE 802.11n, IEEE 802.11ac (5 GHz), IEEE 802.11ax, IEEE 802.11be, IEEE 802.11bn	16
IEEE 802.11ah (900 MHz)	160
IEEE 802.11ad (60 GHz)	3

== Implications for Software Radio ==
Because most Software-Defined Radios use a host computer for processing, the SIFS imposes a difficult-to-achieve time constraint, as the latency for most SDR systems for the signal to traverse from the radio to the host and back to the radio, and vice versa, exceeds the SIFS requirements.

While in some cases it is possible to achieve SIFS requirements for testing, the practical approach is almost always to leverage the FPGA portion of processors common to many commercial SDRs.

== See also ==
- DIFS – DCF Interframe Space
- RIFS – Reduced Interframe Space
- PCF – Point coordination function
  - PIFS – PCF Interframe Space
- EIFS – Extended interframe space
