= Extended interframe space =

IEEE 802.11 protocol

Extended Interframe space (EIFS) is used in IEEE 802.11 based WLANs. If a previously received frame contains an error then a station has to defer EIFS duration instead of DIFS before transmitting a frame. This is because, although this station was not able to decode the frame, it could be that the intended receiver could decode the frame. It should have the opportunity to return an Acknowledgment frame; the EIFS ensures the transmission of the Ack can proceed without interference from those not able to decode the frame.

This duration is calculated by the below method.

EIFS = Transmission time of Ack frame at lowest phy mandatory rate + SIFS + DIFS

== See also ==
- DIFS
- RIFS
- SIFS
