= Reduced Interframe Space =

Reduced Interframe Space (RIFS) is one of the new features introduced in IEEE 802.11n to improve its efficiency. RIFS is the time in micro seconds by which the multiple transmissions from a single station are separated. RIFS is used when no SIFS separated response frames are expected from the receiver. The value of RIFS is 2μs for 802.11n phy.

The use of RIFS is obsolete from 802.11ac amendment onwards. An 802.11ac station will not transmit frames separated by RIFS. So a 11ac station operating in HT mode sets the RIFS mode field in HT operation element to 0.

== See also ==
- SIFS - Short Interframe Space
- PIFS - PCF Interframe Space
- DIFS - DCF Interframe Space
- AIFS - Arbitration Interframe Space
- PCF - Point Coordination Function
