= Block acknowledgement =

Block acknowledgement (BA) was initially defined in IEEE 802.11e as an optional scheme to improve the MAC efficiency. 802.11n amendment ratified in 2009 enhances this BA mechanism then made it as mandatory to support by all 802.11n-capable devices (formally known as HT - High Throughput devices).

Instead of transmitting an individual ACK for every MPDU (i.e., frame), multiple MPDUs can be acknowledged together using a single BA frame. Block Ack (BA) contains bitmap size of 64*16 bits. These 16 bits accounts the fragment number of the MPDUs to be acknowledged. Each bit of this bitmap represent the status (success/failure) of a MPDU.

Block acknowledgement consist of a setup and tear-down of the session phases. In the setup phase, capability information such as buffer size and BA policy are negotiated with the receiver. Once the setup phase completed, the transmitter can send frames without waiting for ACK frame. Finally the BA session is torn down with a so-called DELBA frame.

== Block Ack policies ==
1. HT Immediate BlockAck

2. HT Delayed BlockAck

The frames used in these agreements are:

- BAR (Block Acknowledgement Request)

To request an acknowledgement to the recipient station, confirming that has received a block of frames.

- BA (Block Acknowledgement) response

== BA Variants ==
- Normal (Basic) Block Ack (obsolete)
- Compressed Block Ack
  - It is an enhanced version of BA defined in 802.11n. In compressed BA, Fragmented MSDUs cannot be transmitted and hence the bitmap size is reduced from 1024 (64*16) bits to 64 (64*1) bits.
- Multi TID Block Ack
  - This scheme is applicable only with QoS. Previously described BA variants are capable of acknowledging a single TID (traffic identifier).

The confirmation from the recipient station, stating which frames have been received, this is explicitly mentioned in a matrix (part of the BAR) call the "bit map".

== See also ==
- 802.11 frame types
