= IEEE 802.11k-2008 =

WiFi specification

IEEE 802.11k-2008 is an amendment to IEEE 802.11-2007 standard for radio resource measurement. It defines and exposes radio and network information to facilitate the management and maintenance of a wireless LAN. IEEE 802.11k was incorporated in IEEE Std 802.11-2012; see IEEE 802.11.

== Radio resource measurement ==
IEEE 802.11k and 802.11r are industry standards that enable seamless Basic Service Set (BSS) transitions in the WLAN environment. The 802.11k standard provides information to discover the best available access point.

802.11k is intended to improve the way traffic is distributed within a network. In a wireless LAN, each device normally connects to the access point (AP) that provides the strongest signal. Depending on the number and geographic locations of the subscribers, this arrangement can sometimes lead to excessive demand on one AP and underutilization of others, resulting in degradation of overall network performance. In a network conforming to 802.11k, if the AP having the strongest signal is loaded to its full capacity, a wireless device is connected to one of the underutilized APs. Even though the signal may be weaker, the overall throughput is greater because more efficient use is made of the network resources.

== Protocol operation ==
The following steps are performed before switching to a new access point.

1. The access point determines that client is moving away from it.
2. The access point informs the client to prepare to switch to a new access point.
3. The client requests a list of nearby access points.
4. The access point transmits a site report.
5. Based on the report, the client moves to the best access point.

== See also ==
- IEEE 802.11v
