= Contention ratio =

In computer networking, the contention ratio is the ratio of the potential maximum demand to the actual bandwidth. The higher the contention ratio, the greater the number of users that may be trying to use the actual bandwidth at any one time and, therefore, the lower the effective bandwidth offered, especially at peak times. A contended service is a service which offers the users of the network a minimum statistically guaranteed contention ratio, while typically offering peaks of usage of up to the maximum bandwidth supplied to the user. Contended services are usually much cheaper to provide than uncontended services, although they only reduce the backbone traffic costs for the users, and do not reduce the costs of providing and maintaining equipment for connecting to the network.

== Examples by country ==
In the United Kingdom, a Rate Adaptive Digital Subscriber Line (RADSL) connection used to be marketed with a contention ratio between 20:1 and 50:1 within the British Telecom network, meaning that 20 to 50 subscribers, each assigned or sold a bandwidth of up to 8 Mbit/s for instance, may be sharing 8 Mbit/s of downlink bandwidth. (Note: An account of the state of the issue in the UK is found in an OFCOM 2004 report on wireless internet.) With the advent of ADSL2+ (up to 20 Mbit/s service, though in theory, ADSL2+ provides up to 24 Mbit/s), FTTC (Fibre to the Cabinet) offering 40 Mbit/s services and even FTTP (Fibre to the Premises) offering 100 Mbit/s, BT no longer work on "contention ratio" as a planning rule.

In the United States and on satellite internet connections, the contention ratio is often higher, and other formulas are used, such as counting only those users who are actually online at a particular time. It is also less often divulged by internet service providers elsewhere than it is in the UK. The connection speed for each user will therefore differ depending on the number of computers using the uplink connection at the same time because the uplink (where all the low bandwidth connections join) will only handle the speed that has been implemented on that line.

== Issues ==
One of the issues with a stated contention ratio is that it is not, on its own, adequate for comparing services. There is a huge difference between 1000 users each on a 2 Mbit/s service sharing a 40 Mbit/s pipe, and 50 users each on a 2 Mbit/s service sharing a 2 Mbit/s pipe. In the latter case two users trying to download at the same time means each get 50% of the speed. When there are 1000 users it would take 20 users using their entire 2 Mbit/s link at the same time to show any congestion. However, both of these would be quoted as 50:1 contention.

If there are a small number of users of a contended service, then the peaks and troughs in usage will be very visible to each user, but if the same contention ratio applies to a large number of users then the probability of being affected by the contention can be much smaller. In telephony, 20 users each likely to make a call 10% of the time need 8 lines to ensure that there is less than 0.1% chance of being blocked. With 200 users, the number of lines required is only 35, so that less than five times the number of lines are required for the same probability of being blocked. The same issue applies to broadband service.

== See also ==
- Quality of service
