= Super G (wireless networking) =

Proprietary Wi-Fi performance improvement technology

Super G is a proprietary method to increase the throughput of an IEEE 802.11g (Wi-Fi) wireless LAN. Atheros uses frame-bursting, compression, and channel bonding technology to improve performance. The throughput transmission speed limit when using Super G is claimed to be up to 40 Mbit/s-60 Mbit/s at a 108 Mbit/s signaling rate, which is achieved through the bonding of two 54 Mbit/s 802.11g channels.

== Vendors ==
Other vendors have marketed Super G products as 108G Technology, 108 Mbit/s 802.11g, Xpress technology and Xtreme G. Manufacturers that have licensed Super G technology from Atheros include Airlink 101, Clipsal, D-Link, Intelbras, LevelOne, Netgear, Nortel Networks, Planex, SMC, Sony, TRENDnet, SparkLAN, Toshiba and ZyXEL. In general, Super G products from different vendors are all interoperable in Super G mode.

== Interference ==
Non-standard channel bonding extensions to 802.11g such as Super G, have been criticized for creating interference on all Wi-Fi channels, potentially causing issues with other Wireless devices that use the band, such as neighboring wireless networks, cordless telephones, baby monitors, and Bluetooth devices. However, Atheros claims that in real-world scenarios with physical separation and walls, closely located networks will not experience any interference from a Super G network.

== Alternatives ==
Atheros has also adapted this technology to their 802.11a/g chipsets, marketing it as Super AG.

Super G is one of several competing incompatible proprietary extension approaches that were developed to increase performance of 802.11g wireless devices, such as Xpress from Broadcom, MIMO-based extensions from Airgo Networks, and Nitro from Conexant.

== See also ==
- Proprietary protocol
- Vendor lock-in
