= Distributed coordination function =

Fundamental medium access control technique of Wi-Fi and WLAN

Distributed coordination function (DCF) is the fundamental medium access control (MAC) technique of the IEEE 802.11-based WLAN standard (including Wi-Fi). DCF employs a carrier-sense multiple access with collision avoidance (CSMA/CA) with the binary exponential backoff algorithm.

DCF requires a station wishing to transmit to listen for the channel status for a DIFS interval. If the channel is found busy during the DIFS interval, the station defers its transmission. In a network where a number of stations contend for the wireless medium, if multiple stations sense the channel busy and defer their access, they will also virtually simultaneously find that the channel is released and then try to seize the channel. As a result, collisions may occur. In order to avoid such collisions, DCF also specifies random backoff, which forces a station to defer its access to the channel for an extra period. The length of the backoff period is determined by the following equation:

$\mathrm{Backoff Time} = \mathrm{random}() \times \mathrm{aSlotTime}$

A few features about DCF:

- has an optional virtual carrier sense mechanism that exchanges short Request-to-send (RTS) and Clear-to-send (CTS) frames between source and destination stations during the intervals between the data frame transmissions;
- includes a positive acknowledge scheme, which means that if a frame is successfully received by the destination it is addressed to, the destination needs to send an ACK frame to notify the source of the successful reception;
- it does not solve the hidden node and/or exposed terminal problem completely, it only alleviates the problem through the use of RTS and CTS, and recommends the use of a larger carrier sensing range;
- it is defined in the IEEE 802.11 standard and is the de facto default setting for Wi-Fi hardware.

802.11 DCF consumes a significant amount of airtime, 802.11 control messages usually convey very little information. For example, an ACK message can take up to 60 μs to transmit completely, which includes an amount of airtime sufficient to transmit 3240 bits at 54 Mbit/s, during which it conveys a single bit of relevant information.

The IEEE 802.11 standard also defines an optional access method using a point coordination function (PCF). PCF allows the access point acting as the network coordinator to manage channel access. The IEEE 802.11e amendment to the standard enhances the DCF and the PCF, through a new coordination function called Hybrid Coordination Function (HCF).

== See also ==
- Hybrid coordination function (HCF)
- Point coordination function (PCF)
