= Wireless Multimedia Extensions =

Wireless interoperability certificate

Wireless Multimedia Extensions (WMM)

Protocol Specifications
Standard Baseline	IEEE 802.11e (Quality of Service)
Certification Body	Wi-Fi Alliance
Release Year	2004
Layer Association	Media Access Control (MAC) Sublayer (OSI Layer 2)

Traffic Priority Classes (Access Categories)
WMM-Voice (AC_VO)	Highest priority (VoIP, real-time interactive audio)
WMM-Video (AC_VI)	High priority (Low-delay video streaming, IP video)
WMM-Best Effort (AC_BE)	Normal priority (Standard web traffic, legacy client data)
WMM-Background (AC_BK)	Low priority (Bulk data transfers, file prints, downloads)

Core Operational Elements
Mechanism	Enhanced Distributed Channel Access (EDCA)
Power Profile	WMM-Power Save (U-APSD battery optimization)

Wireless Multimedia Extensions (WME), also known as Wi-Fi Multimedia (WMM), is a Wi-Fi Alliance interoperability certification, based on the IEEE 802.11e standard. It provides basic Quality of service (QoS) features to IEEE 802.11 networks. WMM prioritizes traffic according to four Access Categories (AC): voice (AC_VO), video (AC_VI), best effort (AC_BE), and background (AC_BK). However, it does not provide guaranteed throughput. It is suitable for well-defined applications that require QoS, such as Voice over IP (VoIP) on Wi-Fi phones (VoWLAN).

WMM replaces the Wi-Fi DCF distributed coordination function for CSMA/CA wireless frame transmission with Enhanced Distributed Coordination Function (EDCF). EDCF, according to version 1.1 of the WMM specifications by the Wi-Fi Alliance, defines Access Categories labels AC_VO, AC_VI, AC_BE, and AC_BK for the Enhanced Distributed Channel Access (EDCA) parameters that are used by a WMM-enabled station to control how long it sets its Transmission Opportunity (TXOP), according to the information transmitted by the access point to the station. It is implemented for wireless QoS between RF media.

== Power Save Certification ==
The Wi-Fi Alliance has added Power Save Certification to the WMM specification. Power Save uses mechanisms from 802.11e and legacy 802.11 to save power (for battery powered equipment) and fine-tune power consumption. The certification provides an indication that the certified product is targeted for power critical applications like smart phones and portable power devices (i.e. those that require battery or recharging such as smart phones.)

The underlying concept of WMM PowerSave is that the station (STA) triggers the release of buffered data from the access point (AP) by sending an uplink data frame. Upon receipt of such a data (trigger) frame the AP releases previously buffered data stored in each of its queues. Queues may be configured to be trigger-enabled, (i.e. a receipt of a data frame corresponding to the queue acts as trigger), and delivery enabled, (i.e. data stored at those queues will be released upon receipt of a frame). Queues refer to the four ACs defined for WMM.

== See also ==
- 802.11e: Quality of Service enhancements for Wi-Fi standard 802.11b
- 802.11e-2005 APSD (Automatic Power Save Delivery)
- Sleep Proxy Service
