= Beacon frame =

Type of management frame

802.11 Beacon frame

A beacon frame is a type of management frame in IEEE 802.11 WLANs. It contains information about the network. Beacon frames are transmitted periodically; they serve to announce the presence of a wireless LAN and to provide a timing signal to synchronise communications with the devices using the network (the members of a service set). In an infrastructure basic service set (BSS), beacon frames are transmitted by the access point (AP). In ad hoc (IBSS) networks, beacon generation is distributed among the stations. When having more than 15 SSIDs on non-overlapping channels, beacon frames start to consume significant amount of air time and degrade performance even when most of the networks are idle.

== Components ==
A beacon frame consists of an 802.11 MAC header, a body and a frame check sequence (FCS). Some of the fields in the body are listed below.

- Timestamp
  After receiving the beacon frame, all the stations change their local clocks to this time. This helps with synchronization.
- Beacon interval
  This is the time interval between beacon transmissions. The time at which a node (AP, station when in ad hoc or P2P GO mode) must send a beacon is known as target beacon transmission time (TBTT). The beacon interval is expressed in time units (TU). It is a configurable parameter in the AP and typically configured as 100 TU.
- Capability information
  The capability information field spans to 16 bits and contains information about capabilities of the device and network. Type of network such as ad hoc or Infrastructure network is signaled in this field. Apart from this information, it announces the support for polling, as well as the encryption details.
- Supported rates
  The different speeds at which the network can transmit data.
- SSID
  The network name used to identify a specific wireless network
- Frequency-hopping (FH)
  Settings for networks that use Frequency Hopping Spread Spectrum (FHSS)
- Direct-Sequence (DS)
  Settings for networks that use Direct Sequence Spread Spectrum (DSSS), including the channel number
- Contention-Free (CF)
  Settings for periods when devices do not have to compete to use the wireless channel. Mainly used with PCF (Point Coordination Function), an older Wi-Fi method that controls which devices can transmit
- IBSS
  Settings for Independent Basic Service Sets (IBSS), also known as ad-hoc networks
- Traffic indication map (TIM)
  Indicates when the access point has data waiting for devices using power-saving mode
- Country
  Specifies which wireless channels and transmit power levels can be used, based on local regulations.
- FH
  Settings for networks using Frequency Hopping Spread Spectrum (FHSS), including the hopping pattern and how long the network stays on each frequency.
- FH pattern table
  A table showing the frequency hopping patterns used by FHSS networks.
- Power contraint
  Shows any limits on the access point's transmit power, usually due to local regulations.
- Channel Switch Announcement
  Tells devices that the network is about to switch to a different channel, usually to avoid interference or manage network traffic.
- Vendor specific
  Contains information specific to the manufacturer or vendor, potentially including custom features or extensions. For example, this may include a device’s geographic coordinates, either to indicate its location (such as in the case of a mobile device like a drone) or to allow the device to determine its own location, such as when operating indoors where GPS is unavailable.
- Quiet
  Specifies times when the network must not transmit, usually to detect or avoid disrupting other signals.
- Time Advertisement
  Provides accurate time information so devices across the network stay synchronised

Infrastructure network access points send beacons at a defined interval, which is often set to a default 100 TU which is equivalent to 102.4 ms. In the case of an ad hoc network where there are no access points, a peer station is responsible for sending the beacon. After an ad hoc station receives a beacon frame from a peer, it waits a random amount of time. After that random timeout has elapsed, it will send a beacon frame unless another station has already sent one. In this way, the responsibility of sending beacon frames is rotated amongst all the peers in the ad hoc network, while ensuring that beacons will always be sent.

Most access points allow the changing of the beacon interval. Increasing the beacon interval will cause the beacons to be sent less frequently. This reduces load on the network and increases throughput for clients on the network; however, it has the undesirable effect of delaying association and roaming processes, as stations scanning for access points could potentially miss a beacon while scanning other channels. Alternatively, decreasing the beacon interval causes beacons to be sent more frequently. This increases load on the network and decreases throughput for users, but it does result in a quicker association and roaming process. An additional downside of decreasing the beacon interval is that stations in power save mode will consume more power as they must more frequently awake to receive beacons.

Inspecting an idle network with packet-monitoring tools such as tcpdump or Wireshark would show that most traffic on the network consists of beacon frames, with a few non-802-11 packets mixed in, such as DHCP packets. If users joined the network, responses to each beacon would begin to appear, along with regular traffic generated by the users.

Stations must schedule beacon transmission at the nominal beacon interval. However, the transmission may suffer some delays due to the channel access. Like other frames, beacons must follow the CSMA/CA algorithm. This means that if the channel is busy (e.g., another station is currently sending a frame) when the beacon needs to be sent, it must wait. This means that the actual beacon interval may differ from the nominal beacon interval. However, stations are able to compensate for this difference by inspecting the timestamp in the beacon frame when it is finally sent.

== Function ==
While beacon frames do cause some non-trivial overhead for a network, they are vital for the proper operation of a network. Radio NICs generally scan all RF channels, searching for beacons announcing the presence of a nearby access point. When a radio receives a beacon frame, it receives information about the capabilities and configuration of that network, and is also then able to provide a list of available eligible networks, sorted by signal strength. This allows the device to choose to connect to the optimal network.

Even after associating with a network, the radio NIC will continue to scan for beacons. This has several benefits. Firstly, by continuing to scan for other networks, the station has options for alternative networks if the current access point's signal becomes too weak to continue communication. Secondly, as it still receives beacon frames from the currently associated access point, the device is able to use the timestamps in those beacons to update its internal clock. Beacons from the currently associated access point also inform stations of imminent configuration changes, such as data rate changes.

Finally, beacons enable devices to have power saving modes. Access points will hold on to packets destined for stations that are currently sleeping. In the traffic indication map of a beacon frame, the access point is able to inform stations that they have frames waiting for delivery.
