= Arbitration inter-frame spacing =

Medium access control prioritization scheme

Arbitration inter-frame spacing (AIFS), in wireless LAN communications, is a method of prioritizing one access category (AC) over the other, such as giving voice or video priority over email. AIFS functions by shortening or expanding the period a wireless node has to wait before it is allowed to transmit its next frame. A shorter AIFS period means a message has a higher probability of being transmitted with low latency, which is particularly important for delay-critical data such as voice or streaming video.

AIFS is a time interval between frames being transmitted under the IEEE 802.11e EDCA MAC. AIFS is defined by
$$\textrm{AIFS} = \textrm{AIFSN[AC]} \cdot \textrm{ST} + \textrm{SIFS},$$
where AIFSN (the so-called AIFS-number, a 4-bit integer with a minimum value of 2) depends on the AC. Slot time ST (also denoted by $\sigma$) is dependent on the physical layer. Short Interframe Space (SIFS) is the time between a DATA and ACK frame.

AIFSN[AC] will be set by the AP in the EDCA Parameter set in beacon and probe response frames. If it is not set, then the STA has to use the following default values:

Default values for AIFSN
STA Type	OCB Activated (Note: Controlled by dot11OCBActivated. OCB stands for "outside the context of a BSS", and BSS stands for "basic service set".)	AC_BK (Note: Background.)	AC_BE (Note: Best Effort.)	AC_VI (Note: Video.)	AC_VO (Note: Voice.)
-	True	9	6	4	2
Non-sensor STA	False	7	3	2	2
Sensor STA	-	7	2	5	4

The IEEE 802.11e EDCA MAC has been adopted as part of the IEEE 802.11p standard for Wireless Access in Vehicular Environments (WAVE).
