= IEEE 802.11 =

Wireless network standard

- Wireless LAN Medium Access Control (MAC) and Physical Layer (PHY) Specifications (Note: The full title being "IEEE Standard for Information Technology—Telecommunications and Information Exchange between Systems—Local and Metropolitan Area Networks—Specific Requirements—Part 11: Wireless LAN Medium Access Control (MAC) and Physical Layer (PHY) Specifications"Stacey, Robert. "About 802.11 and How To Participate". IEEE 802 LAN/MAN Standards Committee (LMSC) website.)
- Status: Active
- First published: 18 November 1997
- Latest version: IEEE 802.11-2024; 28 April 2025
- Organization: IEEE
- Committee: IEEE 802.11 Working Group
- Series: IEEE 802
- Domain: Wireless local area networks

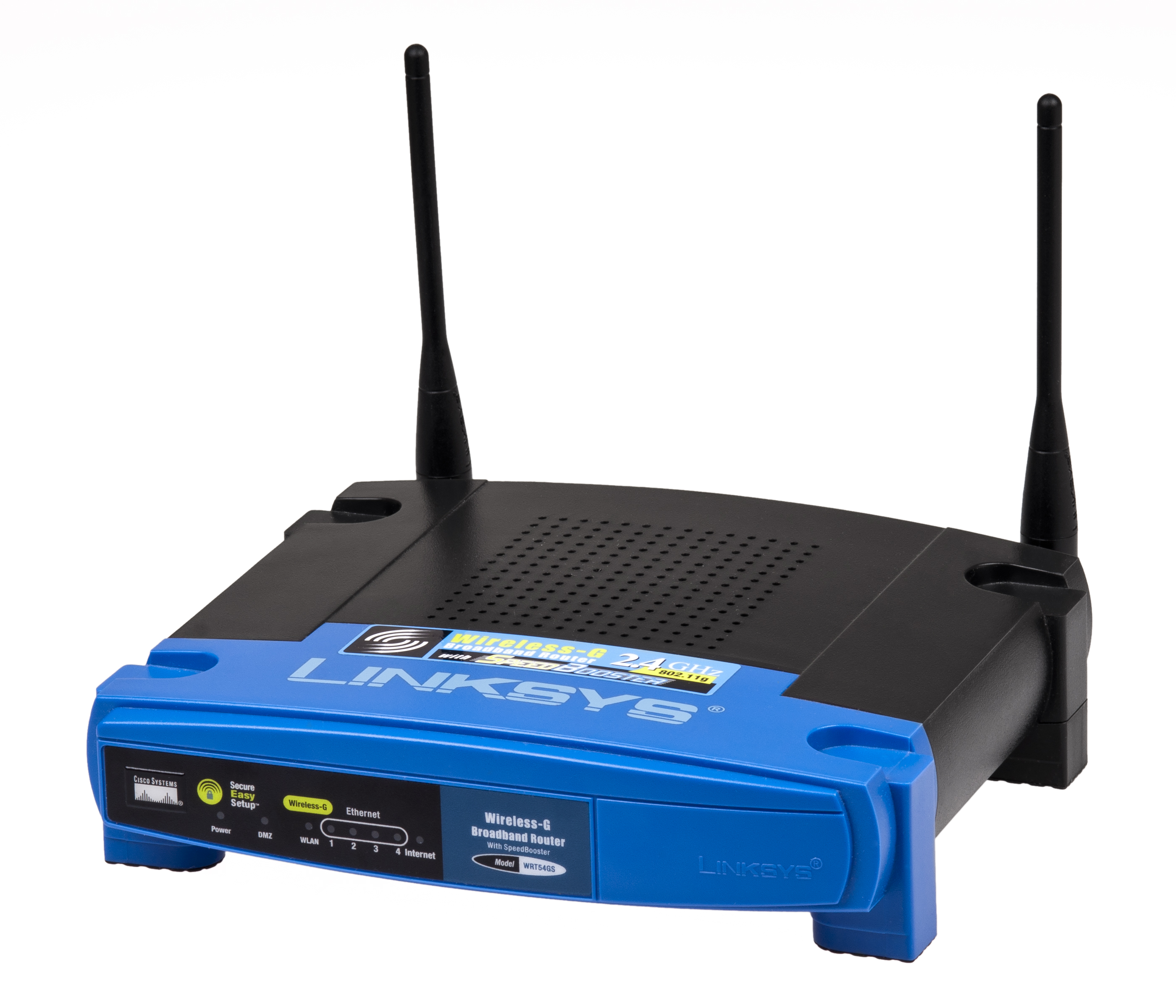
This Linksys WRT54GS, a combined router and Wi‑Fi access point, operates using the 802.11g standard in the 2.4-GHz ISM band using Signalling rates up to 54 Mbit/s.

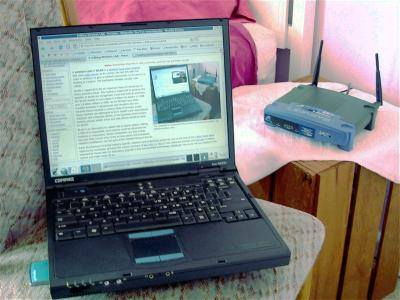
IEEE 802.11 Wi-Fi networks are the most widely used wireless networks in the world, connecting devices like laptops (left) to the internet through a wireless router (right).

IEEE 802.11 is part of the IEEE 802 set of local area network (LAN) technical standards, and specifies the set of medium access control (MAC) and physical layer (PHY) protocols for implementing wireless local area network (WLAN) computer communication. The standard and amendments provide the basis for wireless network products using the Wi-Fi brand and are the world's most widely used wireless computer networking standards. IEEE 802.11 is used in most home and office networks to allow laptops, printers, smartphones, and other devices to communicate with each other and access the Internet without connecting wires.

The standards are created and maintained by the Institute of Electrical and Electronics Engineers (IEEE) LAN/MAN Standards Committee (IEEE 802). The base version of the standard was released in 1997 and has had subsequent amendments. While each amendment is officially revoked when it is incorporated in the latest version of the standard, the corporate world tends to market to the revisions because they concisely denote the capabilities of their products. As a result, in the marketplace, each revision tends to become its own standard. 802.11x is a shorthand for "any version of 802.11", to avoid confusion with "802.11" used specifically for the original 1997 version.

The IEEE 802.11 family uses various radio frequencies, including, but not limited to, 2.4-, 5-, 6-, and 60-GHz bands. Although IEEE 802.11 specifications list channels that might be used, the allowed radio frequency spectrum varies significantly by regulatory domain.

The protocols are typically used on a network stack in conjunction with IEEE 802.2, and are designed to interwork seamlessly with Ethernet, and are very often used to carry Internet Protocol traffic. IEEE 802.11 is also a basis for vehicle-based communication networks with IEEE 802.11p.

== General description ==
The 802.11 family consists of a series of half-duplex over-the-air modulation techniques that use the same basic protocol. The 802.11 protocol family employs carrier-sense multiple access with collision avoidance (CSMA/CA) whereby equipment listens to a channel for other users (including non-802.11 users) before transmitting each frame (some use the term "packet", which may be ambiguous: "frame" is more technically correct).

802.11-1997 was the first wireless networking standard in the family, but 802.11b was the first widely accepted one, followed by 802.11a, 802.11g, 802.11n, 802.11ac, and 802.11ax. Other standards in the family (c–f, h, j) are service amendments that are used to extend the current scope of the existing standard, which amendments may also include corrections to a previous specification.

802.11b and 802.11g use the 2.4-GHz ISM band, operating in the United States under Part 15 of the US Federal Communications Commission Rules and Regulations. 802.11n can also use that 2.4-GHz band. Because of this choice of frequency band, 802.11b/g/n equipment may occasionally suffer interference in the 2.4-GHz band from microwave ovens, cordless telephones, and Bluetooth devices. 802.11b and 802.11g control their interference and susceptibility to interference by using direct-sequence spread spectrum (DSSS) and orthogonal frequency-division multiplexing (OFDM) signalling methods, respectively.

802.11a uses the 5-GHz U-NII band which, for much of the world, offers at least 23 non-overlapping channels that are 20 MHz wide. This is an advantage over the 2.4-GHz ISM-frequency band, which offers only three non-overlapping channels that are 20 MHz wide where other adjacent channels overlap (see: list of WLAN channels). Better or worse performance with higher or lower frequencies (channels) may be realized, depending on the environment. 802.11n and 802.11ax can use either the 2.4- or 5-GHz band; 802.11ac uses only the 5-GHz band.

The segment of the radio frequency spectrum used by 802.11 varies between countries. In the US, 802.11a and 802.11g devices may be operated without a licence, as allowed in Part 15 of the FCC Rules and Regulations. Frequencies used by channels one through six of 802.11b and 802.11g fall within the 2.4 GHz amateur radio band. Licensed amateur radio operators may operate 802.11b/g devices under Part 97 of the FCC Rules and Regulations, allowing increased power output but not commercial content or encryption.

== Generations ==
Wi-Fi and IEEE 802.11 generations
Genera- tion	IEEE standard	Adopt- ed	Link rate (Mbit/s)	Frequency (GHz)		
Genera- tion	IEEE standard	Adopt- ed	Link rate (Mbit/s)	2.4	5	6
—	802.11	1997	1–2	Yes		
—	802.11b	1999	1–11	Yes		
—	802.11a	1999	6–54		Yes	
—	802.11g	2003	6–54	Yes		
Wi-Fi 4	802.11n	2009	6.5–600	Yes	Yes	
Wi-Fi 5	802.11ac	2013	6.5–6,933	(Note: 802.11ac only specifies operation in the 5 GHz band. Operation in the 2.4 GHz band is specified by 802.11n.)	Yes	
Wi-Fi 6	802.11ax	2021	0.4–9,608	Yes	Yes	
Wi-Fi 6E	802.11ax	2021	0.4–9,608	Yes	Yes	Yes
Wi-Fi 7	802.11be	2024	0.4–23,059	Yes	Yes	Yes
Wi-Fi 8	802.11bn	TBA	0.4–23,059	Yes	Yes	Yes

In 2018, the Wi-Fi Alliance began using a consumer-friendly generation numbering scheme for the publicly used 802.11 protocols. Wi-Fi generations 1–8 use the 802.11b, 802.11a, 802.11g, 802.11n, 802.11ac, 802.11ax, 802.11be and 802.11bn protocols, in that order.

== History ==
802.11 technology has its origins in a 1985 ruling by the US Federal Communications Commission that released the ISM band for unlicensed use.

In 1991 NCR Corporation/AT&T (now Nokia Labs and LSI Corporation) invented a precursor to 802.11 in Nieuwegein, the Netherlands. The inventors initially intended to use the technology for cashier systems. The first wireless products were brought to the market under the name WaveLAN with raw data rates of 1 Mbit/s and 2 Mbit/s.

Vic Hayes, who held the chair of IEEE 802.11 for 10 years, and has been called the "father of Wi-Fi", was involved in designing the initial 802.11b and 802.11a standards within the IEEE. He, along with Bell Labs Engineer Bruce Tuch, approached IEEE to create a standard.

In 1999, the Wi-Fi Alliance was formed as a trade association to hold the Wi-Fi trademark under which most products are sold.

The major commercial breakthrough came with Apple's adoption of Wi-Fi for their iBook series of laptops in 1999. It was the first mass consumer product to offer Wi-Fi network connectivity, which was then branded by Apple as AirPort. One year later IBM followed with its ThinkPad 1300 series in 2000.

== Protocol ==
802.11 network standards
Frequency range, or type	PHY	Protocol	Release date	Frequency band	Channel width	Stream data rate	Max. MIMO streams	Modulation	Approx. range	
Frequency range, or type	PHY	Protocol	Release date	Frequency band	Channel width	Stream data rate	Max. MIMO streams	Modulation	Indoor	Outdoor
Frequency range, or type	PHY	Protocol	Release date	(GHz)	(MHz)	(Mbit/s)	Max. MIMO streams	Modulation	Indoor	Outdoor
1–7 GHz	DSSS, ~~FHSS~~ (Note: This is obsolete, and support for this might be subject to removal in a future revision of the standard)	802.11-1997	June 1997	2.4	22	1, 2	—N/a	DSSS, ~~FHSS~~	20 m (66 ft)	100 m (330 ft)
1–7 GHz	HR/DSSS	802.11b	September 1999	2.4	22	1, 2, 5.5, 11	—N/a	CCK, DSSS	35 m (115 ft)	140 m (460 ft)
1–7 GHz	OFDM	802.11a	September 1999	5	5, 10, 20	6, 9, 12, 18, 24, 36, 48, 54 (for 20 MHz bandwidth, divide by 2 and 4 for 10 and 5 MHz)	—N/a	OFDM	35 m (115 ft)	120 m (390 ft)
1–7 GHz	OFDM	802.11j	November 2004	4.9, 5.0 (Note: For Japanese regulation.)	5, 10, 20	6, 9, 12, 18, 24, 36, 48, 54 (for 20 MHz bandwidth, divide by 2 and 4 for 10 and 5 MHz)	—N/a	OFDM	?	?
1–7 GHz	OFDM	802.11y	November 2008	3.7 (Note: IEEE 802.11y-2008 extended operation of 802.11a to the licensed 3.7 GHz band. Increased power limits allow a range up to 5,000 m. As of 2009, it is only being licensed in the United States by the FCC.)	5, 10, 20	6, 9, 12, 18, 24, 36, 48, 54 (for 20 MHz bandwidth, divide by 2 and 4 for 10 and 5 MHz)	—N/a	OFDM	?	5,000 m (16,000 ft)
1–7 GHz	OFDM	802.11p	July 2010	5.9	5, 10, 20	6, 9, 12, 18, 24, 36, 48, 54 (for 20 MHz bandwidth, divide by 2 and 4 for 10 and 5 MHz)	—N/a	OFDM	200 m	1,000 m (3,300 ft)
1–7 GHz	OFDM	802.11bd	December 2022	5.9, 60	5, 10, 20	6, 9, 12, 18, 24, 36, 48, 54 (for 20 MHz bandwidth, divide by 2 and 4 for 10 and 5 MHz)	—N/a	OFDM	500 m	1,000 m (3,300 ft)
1–7 GHz	ERP-OFDM	802.11g	June 2003	2.4	5, 10, 20	6, 9, 12, 18, 24, 36, 48, 54 (for 20 MHz bandwidth, divide by 2 and 4 for 10 and 5 MHz)	—N/a	OFDM	38 m (125 ft)	140 m (460 ft)
1–7 GHz	HT-OFDM	802.11n (Wi-Fi 4)	October 2009	2.4, 5	20	Up to 288.8 (Note: Based on short guard interval; standard guard interval is ~10% slower. Rates vary widely based on distance, obstructions, and interference.)	4	MIMO-OFDM (64-QAM)	70 m (230 ft)	250 m (820 ft)
1–7 GHz	HT-OFDM	802.11n (Wi-Fi 4)	October 2009	2.4, 5	40	Up to 600	4	MIMO-OFDM (64-QAM)	70 m (230 ft)	250 m (820 ft)
1–7 GHz	VHT-OFDM	802.11ac (Wi-Fi 5)	December 2013	5	20	Up to 693	8	DL; MU-MIMO OFDM (256-QAM)	35 m (115 ft)	?
1–7 GHz	VHT-OFDM	802.11ac (Wi-Fi 5)	December 2013	5	40	Up to 1,600	8	DL; MU-MIMO OFDM (256-QAM)	35 m (115 ft)	?
1–7 GHz	VHT-OFDM	802.11ac (Wi-Fi 5)	December 2013	5	80	Up to 3,467	8	DL; MU-MIMO OFDM (256-QAM)	35 m (115 ft)	?
1–7 GHz	VHT-OFDM	802.11ac (Wi-Fi 5)	December 2013	5	160	Up to 6,933	8	DL; MU-MIMO OFDM (256-QAM)	35 m (115 ft)	?
1–7 GHz	HE-OFDMA	802.11ax (Wi-Fi 6, Wi-Fi 6E)	May 2021	2.4, 5, 6	20	Up to 1,147 (Note: For single-user cases only, based on default guard interval which is 0.8 microseconds. Since multi-user via OFDMA has become available for 802.11ax, these may decrease. Also, these theoretical values depend on the link distance, whether the link is line-of-sight or not, interferences and the multi-path components in the environment.)	8	UL/DL; MU-MIMO OFDMA (1024-QAM)	30 m (98 ft)	120 m (390 ft) (Note: The default guard interval is 0.8 microseconds. However, 802.11ax extended the maximum available guard interval to 3.2 microseconds, in order to support outdoor communications, where the maximum possible propagation delay is larger compared to Indoor environments.)
1–7 GHz	HE-OFDMA	802.11ax (Wi-Fi 6, Wi-Fi 6E)	May 2021	2.4, 5, 6	40	Up to 2,294	8	UL/DL; MU-MIMO OFDMA (1024-QAM)	30 m (98 ft)	120 m (390 ft)
1–7 GHz	HE-OFDMA	802.11ax (Wi-Fi 6, Wi-Fi 6E)	May 2021	2.4, 5, 6	80	Up to 5,500	8	UL/DL; MU-MIMO OFDMA (1024-QAM)	30 m (98 ft)	120 m (390 ft)
1–7 GHz	HE-OFDMA	802.11ax (Wi-Fi 6, Wi-Fi 6E)	May 2021	2.4, 5, 6	80+80	Up to 11,000	8	UL/DL; MU-MIMO OFDMA (1024-QAM)	30 m (98 ft)	120 m (390 ft)
1–7 GHz	EHT-OFDMA	802.11be (Wi-Fi 7)	Sep 2024	2.4, 5, 6	80	Up to 5,764	8	UL/DL; MU-MIMO OFDMA (4096-QAM)	30 m (98 ft)	120 m (390 ft)
1–7 GHz	EHT-OFDMA	802.11be (Wi-Fi 7)	Sep 2024	2.4, 5, 6	160 (80+80)	Up to 11,500	8	UL/DL; MU-MIMO OFDMA (4096-QAM)	30 m (98 ft)	120 m (390 ft)
1–7 GHz	EHT-OFDMA	802.11be (Wi-Fi 7)	Sep 2024	2.4, 5, 6	240 (160+80)	Up to 14,282	8	UL/DL; MU-MIMO OFDMA (4096-QAM)	30 m (98 ft)	120 m (390 ft)
1–7 GHz	EHT-OFDMA	802.11be (Wi-Fi 7)	Sep 2024	2.4, 5, 6	320 (160+160)	Up to 23,059	8	UL/DL; MU-MIMO OFDMA (4096-QAM)	30 m (98 ft)	120 m (390 ft)
1–7 GHz	UHR	802.11bn (Wi-Fi 8)	May 2028 (est.)	2.4, 5, 6	320	Up to 23,059	8	Multi-link; MU-MIMO OFDM (4096-QAM)	?	?
1–7 GHz	WUR (Note: Wake-up Radio (WUR) Operation.)	802.11ba	October 2021	2.4, 5	4, 20	0.0625, 0.25 (62.5 kbit/s, 250 kbit/s)	—N/a	OOK (multi-carrier OOK)	?	?
mmWave (WiGig)	DMG	802.11ad	December 2012	60	2,160 (2.16 GHz)	Up to 8,085 (8 Gbit/s)	—N/a	~~OFDM~~, single carrier, low-power single carrier	3.3 m (11 ft)	?
mmWave (WiGig)	DMG	802.11aj	April 2018	60 (Note: For Chinese regulation.)	1,080	Up to 3,754 (3.75 Gbit/s)	—N/a	single carrier, low-power single carrier	?	?
mmWave (WiGig)	CMMG	802.11aj	April 2018	45	540, 1,080	Up to 15,015 (15 Gbit/s)	4	OFDM, single carrier	?	?
mmWave (WiGig)	EDMG	802.11ay	July 2021	60	Up to 8,640 (8.64 GHz)	Up to 303,336 (303 Gbit/s)	8	OFDM, single carrier	10 m (33 ft)	100 m (328 ft)
Sub 1 GHz (IoT)	TVHT	802.11af	February 2014	0.054– 0.79	6, 7, 8	Up to 568.9	4	MIMO-OFDM	?	?
Sub 1 GHz (IoT)	S1G	802.11ah	May 2017	0.7, 0.8, 0.9	1–16	Up to 8.67 (@2 MHz)	4	MIMO-OFDM	?	?
Light (Li-Fi)	LC (VLC/OWC)	802.11bb	November 2023	800–1000 nm	20	Up to 9.6 Gbit/s	—N/a	O-OFDM	?	?
Light (Li-Fi)	~~IR~~ (IrDA)	802.11-1997	June 1997	850–900 nm	?	1, 2	—N/a	~~PPM~~	?	?
802.11 Standard rollups
		802.11-2007 (802.11ma)	March 2007	2.4, 5		Up to 54		DSSS, OFDM		
		802.11-2012 (802.11mb)	March 2012	2.4, 5		Up to 150		DSSS, OFDM		
		802.11-2016 (802.11mc)	December 2016	2.4, 5, 60		Up to 866.7 or 6,757		DSSS, OFDM		
		802.11-2020 (802.11md)	December 2020	2.4, 5, 60		Up to 866.7 or 6,757		DSSS, OFDM		
		802.11-2024 (802.11me)	September 2024	2.4, 5, 6, 60		Up to 9,608 or 303,336		DSSS, OFDM		

=== 802.11-1997 (802.11 legacy) ===
The original version of the standard IEEE 802.11 was released in 1997 and clarified in 1999, but is now obsolete. It specified two net bit rates of 1 or 2 megabits per second (Mbit/s), plus forward error correction code. It specified three alternative physical layer technologies: diffuse infrared operating at 1 Mbit/s; frequency-hopping spread spectrum operating at 1 Mbit/s or 2 Mbit/s; and direct-sequence spread spectrum operating at 1 Mbit/s or 2 Mbit/s. The latter two radio technologies used microwave transmission over the Industrial Scientific Medical frequency band at 2.4 GHz. Some earlier WLAN technologies used lower frequencies, such as the US 900-MHz ISM band.

Legacy 802.11 with direct-sequence spread spectrum was rapidly supplanted and popularized by 802.11b.

=== 802.11a (OFDM waveform) ===
802.11a, published in 1999, uses the same data link layer protocol and frame format as the original standard, but an OFDM based air interface (physical layer) was added.

It operates in the 5-GHz band with a maximum net data rate of 54 Mbit/s, plus error correction code, which yields realistic net achievable throughput in the mid-20 Mbit/s. It has seen widespread worldwide implementation, particularly within the corporate workspace.

Since the 2.4-GHz band is heavily used to the point of being crowded, using the relatively unused 5-GHz band gives 802.11a a significant advantage. However, this high carrier frequency also brings a disadvantage: the effective overall range of 802.11a is less than that of 802.11b/g. In theory, 802.11a signals are absorbed more readily by walls and other solid objects in their path due to their smaller wavelength, and, as a result, cannot penetrate as far as those of 802.11b. In practice, 802.11b typically has a higher range at low speeds (802.11b will reduce speed to 5.5 Mbit/s or even 1 Mbit/s at low signal strengths). 802.11a also suffers from interference, but locally there may be fewer signals to interfere with, resulting in less interference and better throughput.

=== 802.11b ===
The 802.11b standard has a maximum raw data rate of 11 Mbit/s (Megabits per second) and uses the same media access method defined in the original standard. 802.11b products appeared on the market in early 2000, since 802.11b is a direct extension of the modulation technique defined in the original standard. The dramatic increase in throughput of 802.11b (compared to the original standard), along with simultaneous substantial price reductions, led to the rapid acceptance of 802.11b as the definitive wireless LAN technology.

Devices using 802.11b experience interference from other products operating in the 2.4-GHz band. Devices operating in the 2.4 GHz range include microwave ovens, Bluetooth devices, baby monitors, cordless telephones, and some amateur radio equipment. As unlicensed intentional radiators in this ISM band, they must not interfere with and must tolerate interference from primary or secondary allocations (users) of this band, such as amateur radio.

The IEEE 802.11be-2024 amendment was approved by the IEEE SA Standards Board on 26 September 2024 and published on 22 July 2025. It modifies both the MAC and PHY layers, targeting at least one operating mode with 30 Gbit/s MAC-SAP throughput across 1–7.250 GHz while maintaining coexistence with legacy 802.11 devices in the 2.4-, 5- and 6-GHz bands.

=== 802.11g ===
In June 2003, a third modulation standard was ratified: 802.11g. This works in the 2.4-GHz band (like 802.11b), but uses the same OFDM based transmission scheme as 802.11a. It operates at a maximum physical layer bit rate of 54 Mbit/s exclusive of forward error correction codes, or about 22 Mbit/s average throughput. 802.11g hardware is fully backward compatible with 802.11b hardware, and therefore is encumbered with legacy issues that reduce throughput by ~21% when compared to 802.11a.

The then-proposed 802.11g standard was rapidly adopted in the market starting in January 2003, well before ratification, due to the desire for higher data rates as well as reductions in manufacturing costs. By summer 2003, most dual-band 802.11a/b products became dual-band/tri-mode, supporting a and b/g in a single mobile adapter card or access point. Details of making b and g work well together occupied much of the lingering technical process; in an 802.11g network, however, the activity of an 802.11b participant will reduce the data rate of the overall 802.11g network.

Like 802.11b, 802.11g devices also suffer interference from other products operating in the 2.4-GHz band, for example, wireless keyboards.

=== 802.11-2007 ===
In 2003, task group TGma was authorized to "roll up" many of the amendments to the 1999 version of the 802.11 standard. REVma or 802.11ma, as it was called, created a single document that merged 8 amendments (802.11a, b, d, e, g, h, i, j) with the base standard. Upon approval on 8 March 2007, 802.11REVma was renamed to the then-current base standard IEEE 802.11-2007.

=== 802.11n ===
802.11n is an amendment that improves upon the previous 802.11 standards; its first draft of certification was published in 2006. The 802.11n standard was retroactively labelled as Wi-Fi 4 by the Wi-Fi Alliance. The standard added support for multiple-input multiple-output antennas (MIMO). 802.11n operates on both the 2.4- and the 5-GHz bands. Support for 5-GHz bands is optional. Its net data rate ranges from 54–600 Mbit/s. The IEEE has approved the amendment, and it was published in October 2009.

Prior to the final ratification, enterprises were already migrating to 802.11n networks based on the Wi-Fi Alliance's certification of products conforming to a 2007 draft of the 802.11n proposal. Early Intel WiFi cards were not compatible with the final standard. Many rival access points and cards also did not support 5 GHz at all.

=== 802.11-2012 ===
In May 2007, task group TGmb was authorized to "roll up" many of the amendments to the 2007 version of the 802.11 standard. REVmb or 802.11mb, as it was called, created a single document that merged ten amendments (802.11k, r, y, n, w, p, z, v, u, s) with the 2007 base standard. In addition much clean-up was done, including a reordering of many of the clauses. Upon publication on 29 March 2012, the new standard was referred to as IEEE 802.11-2012.

=== 802.11ac ===
IEEE 802.11ac-2013 is an amendment to IEEE 802.11, published in December 2013, that builds on 802.11n. The 802.11ac standard was retroactively labelled as Wi-Fi 5 by the Wi-Fi Alliance. Changes compared to 802.11n include wider channels (80 or 160 MHz versus 40 MHz) in the 5-GHz band, more spatial streams (up to eight versus four), higher-order modulation (up to 256-QAM vs. 64-QAM), and the addition of Multi-user MIMO (MU-MIMO). The Wi-Fi Alliance separated the introduction of ac wireless products into two phases ("waves"), named "Wave 1" and "Wave 2". From mid-2013, the alliance started certifying Wave 1 802.11ac products shipped by manufacturers, based on the IEEE 802.11ac Draft 3.0 (the IEEE standard was not finalized until later that year). In 2016 Wi-Fi Alliance introduced the Wave 2 certification, to provide higher bandwidth and capacity than Wave 1 products. Wave 2 products include additional features like MU-MIMO, 160 MHz channel width support, support for more 5 GHz channels, and four spatial streams (with four antennas; compared to three in Wave 1 and 802.11n, and eight in IEEE's 802.11ax specification).

=== 802.11ad ===
IEEE 802.11ad is an amendment that defines a new physical layer for 802.11 networks to operate in the 60-GHz millimetre-wave spectrum. This frequency band has significantly different propagation characteristics than the 2.4 GHz and 5-GHz bands where Wi-Fi networks operate. Products implementing the 802.11ad standard are sold under the WiGig brand name, with a certification program developed by the Wi-Fi Alliance. The peak transmission rate of 802.11ad is 7 Gbit/s.

The WiGig standard was announced in 2009; IEEE 802.11ad was ratified and published in December 2012.

IEEE 802.11ad is used for very high data rates (about 8 Gbit/s) and for short-range communication (about 1–10 metres).

TP-Link announced the world's first 802.11ad router in January 2016.

=== 802.11af ===
IEEE 802.11af, also referred to as "White-Fi" and "Super Wi-Fi", is an amendment, approved in February 2014, that allows WLAN operation in TV white space spectrum in the VHF and UHF bands between 54 and 790 MHz. It uses cognitive radio technology to transmit on unused TV channels, with the standard taking measures to limit interference for primary users, such as analogue TV, digital TV, and wireless microphones. Access points and stations determine their position using a satellite positioning system such as GPS, and use the Internet to query a geolocation database (GDB) provided by a regional regulatory agency to discover what frequency channels are available for use at a given time and position. The physical layer uses OFDM and is based on 802.11ac. The propagation path loss as well as the attenuation by materials such as brick and concrete is lower in the UHF and VHF bands than in the 2.4- and 5-GHz bands, which increases the possible range. The frequency channels are 6 to 8 MHz wide, depending on the regulatory domain. Up to four channels may be bonded in either one or two contiguous blocks. MIMO operation is possible with up to four streams used for either space–time block code (STBC) or multi-user (MU) operation. The achievable data rate per spatial stream is 26.7 Mbit/s for 6 and 7 MHz channels, and 35.6 Mbit/s for 8 MHz channels. With four spatial streams and four bonded channels, the maximum data rate is 426.7 Mbit/s for 6 and 7 MHz channels and 568.9 Mbit/s for 8 MHz channels.

=== 802.11-2016 ===
IEEE 802.11-2016 which was known as IEEE 802.11 REVmc, is a revision based on IEEE 802.11-2012, incorporating 5 amendments (11ae, 11aa, 11ad, 11ac, 11af). In addition, existing MAC and PHY functions have been enhanced, and obsolete features were removed or marked for removal. Some clauses and annexes have been renumbered.

=== 802.11ah ===
IEEE 802.11ah, published in 2017, defines a WLAN system operating at sub-1 GHz licence-exempt bands. Due to the favourable propagation characteristics of the low-frequency spectra, 802.11ah can provide improved transmission range compared with the conventional 802.11 WLANs operating in the 2.4- and 5-GHz bands. 802.11ah can be used for various purposes including large-scale sensor networks, extended-range hotspots, and outdoor Wi-Fi for cellular WAN carrier traffic offloading, whereas the available bandwidth is relatively narrow. The protocol intends consumption to be competitive with low-power Bluetooth, at a much wider range.

=== 802.11ai ===
IEEE 802.11ai is an amendment to the 802.11 standard that added new mechanisms for a faster initial link setup time.

=== 802.11aj ===
IEEE 802.11aj is a derivative of 802.11ad for use in the 45 GHz unlicensed spectrum available in some regions of the world (specifically China); it also provides additional capabilities for use in the 60-GHz band.

Alternatively known as China Millimetre Wave (CMMW).

=== 802.11aq ===
IEEE 802.11aq is an amendment to the 802.11 standard that will enable pre-association discovery of services. This extends some of the mechanisms in 802.11u that enabled device discovery to discover further the services running on a device, or provided by a network.

=== 802.11-2020 ===
IEEE 802.11-2020, which was known as IEEE 802.11 REVmd, is a revision based on IEEE 802.11-2016 incorporating 5 amendments (11ai, 11ah, 11aj, 11ak, 11aq). In addition, existing MAC and PHY functions have been enhanced and obsolete features were removed or marked for removal. Some clauses and annexes have been added.

=== 802.11ax ===
IEEE 802.11ax is the successor to 802.11ac, marketed as Wi-Fi 6 (2.4 GHz and 5 GHz) and Wi-Fi 6E (6 GHz) by the Wi-Fi Alliance. It is also known as High Efficiency Wi-Fi, for the overall improvements to Wi-Fi 6 clients in dense environments. For an individual client, the maximum improvement in data rate (PHY speed) against the predecessor (802.11ac) is only 39% (Note: 802.11ax with 2402 Mbit/s (MCS Index 11, 2 spatial streams, 160 MHz); versus 802.11ac with 1733.3 Mbit/s (MCS Index 9, 2 spatial streams, 160 MHz).) (for comparison, this improvement was nearly 500% (Note: 802.11ac with 1733.3 Mbit/s (MCS Index 9, 2 spatial streams, 160 MHz); versus 802.11n with 300 Mbit/s (MCS Index 7, 2 spatial streams, 40 MHz) (Note: This improvement is 1100% if we consider 144.4 Mbit/s (MCS Index 15, 2 spatial streams, 20 MHz), due to 40 MHz mode from 802.11n (at 2.4 GHz) having little practical use in most scenarios.).) for the predecessors). (Note: An IEEE article considers only a 37% growth for 802.11ax and a 1000% growth for both 802.11ac and 802.11n.) Yet, even with this comparatively minor 39% figure, the goal was to provide 4 times the throughput-per-area (Note: Throughput-per-area, as defined by IEEE, is the ratio of the total network throughput to the network area.) of 802.11ac (hence High Efficiency). The motivation behind this goal was the deployment of WLAN in dense environments such as corporate offices, shopping malls and dense residential apartments. This is achieved by means of a technique called OFDMA, which is basically multiplexing in the frequency domain (as opposed to spatial multiplexing, as in 802.11ac). This is equivalent to cellular technology applied to Wi-Fi.

The IEEE 802.11ax‑2021 standard was approved on 9 February 2021.

=== 802.11ay ===
IEEE 802.11ay is a standard that is being developed, also called EDMG: Enhanced Directional MultiGigabit PHY. It is an amendment that defines a new physical layer for 802.11 networks to operate in the 60-GHz millimetre-wave spectrum. It will be an extension of the existing 11ad, aimed at extending the throughput, range, and use cases. The main use cases include indoor operation and short-range communications due to atmospheric oxygen absorption and the inability to penetrate walls. The peak transmission rate of 802.11ay is 40 Gbit/s. The main extensions include: channel bonding (2, 3 and 4), MIMO (up to 4 streams) and higher modulation schemes. The expected range is 300–500 m.

=== 802.11ba ===
IEEE 802.11ba Wake-up Radio (WUR) Operation is an amendment to the IEEE 802.11 standard that enables energy-efficient operation for data reception without increasing latency. The target active power consumption to receive a WUR packet is less than 1 milliwatt and supports data rates of 62.5 kbit/s and 250 kbit/s. The WUR PHY uses MC-OOK (multicarrier OOK) to achieve extremely low power consumption.

=== 802.11bb ===
IEEE 802.11bb is a networking protocol standard in the IEEE 802.11 set of protocols that uses infrared light for communications.

=== 802.11be ===
IEEE 802.11be Extremely High Throughput (EHT) is the next amendment to the 802.11 IEEE standard, and is designated as Wi-Fi 7. It builds upon 802.11ax, focusing on WLAN indoor and outdoor operation with stationary and pedestrian speeds in the 2.4-, 5-, and 6-GHz frequency bands.

== Common misunderstandings about achievable throughput ==
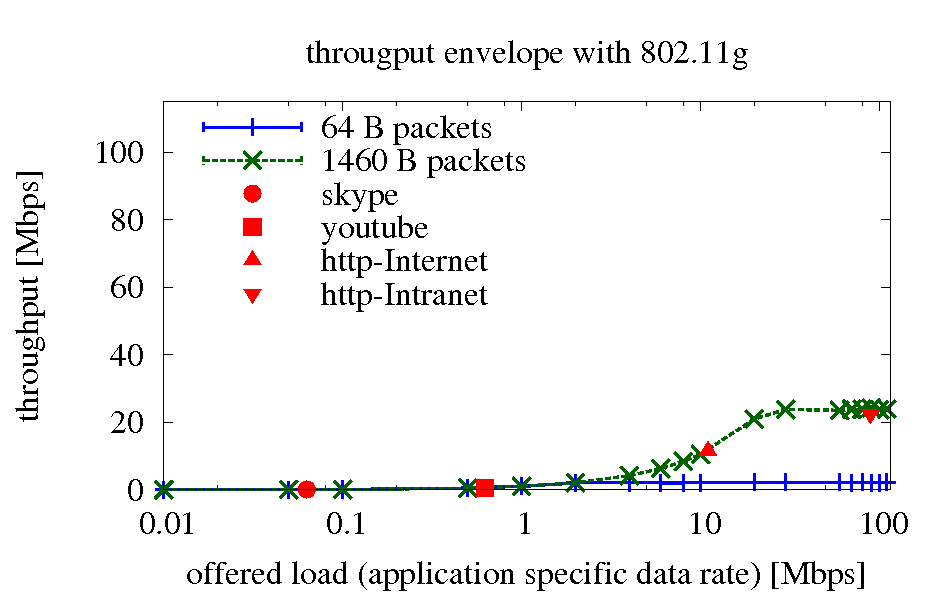
Graphical representation of Wi‑Fi application-specific (UDP) performance envelope in the 2.4-GHz band with 802.11g. {{{1}}} 1 Mbit/s.

Across all variations of 802.11, maximum achievable throughputs are given either based on measurements under ideal conditions or in the layer-2 data rates. However, this does not apply to typical deployments in which data is being transferred between two endpoints, of which at least one is typically connected to a wired infrastructure, and the other endpoint is connected to an infrastructure via a wireless link.

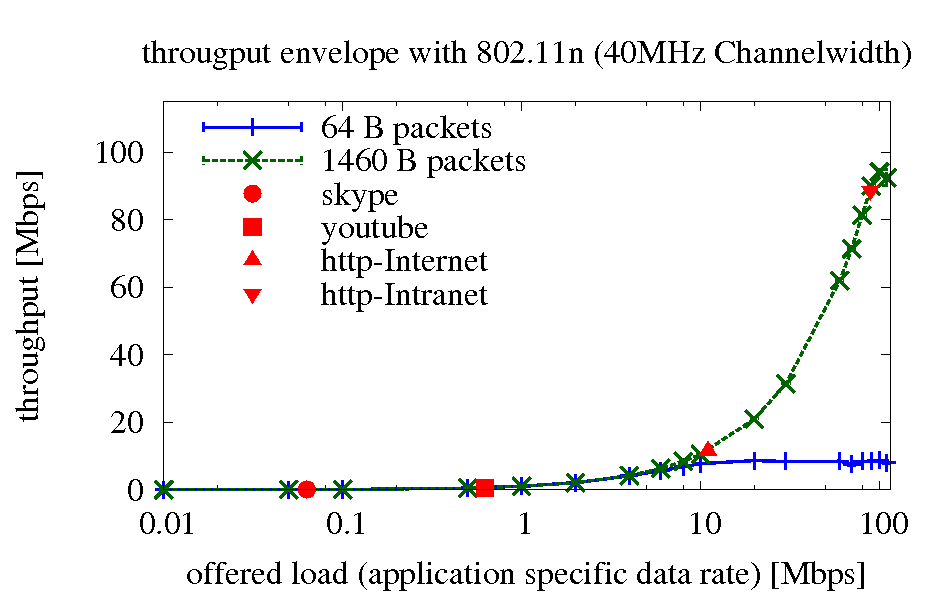
Graphical representation of Wi‑Fi application-specific (UDP) performance envelope in the 2.4-GHz band with 802.11n, using a 40-MHz channel

This means that, typically, data frames pass an 802.11 (WLAN) medium and are being converted to 802.3 (Ethernet) or vice versa. Due to the difference in the frame (header) lengths of these two media, the application's packet size determines the speed of the data transfer. This means applications that use small packets (e.g., VoIP) create dataflows with high-overhead traffic (i.e., a low goodput). Other factors that contribute to the overall application data rate are the speed with which the application transmits the packets (i.e., the data rate) and, of course, the energy with which the wireless signal is received. The latter is determined by distance and by the configured output power of the communicating devices.

The same references apply to the attached graphs that show measurements of UDP throughput. Each represents an average (UDP) throughput (please note that the error bars are there but barely visible due to the small variation) of 25 measurements. Each is with a specific packet size (small or large) and with a specific data rate (10 kbit/s – 100 Mbit/s). Markers for traffic profiles of common applications are included as well. These figures assume there are no packet errors, which, if occurring, will lower the transmission rate further.

== Channels and frequencies ==
802.11b, 802.11g, and 802.11n-2.4 utilize the 2.400–2.500-GHz spectrum, one of the ISM bands. 802.11a, 802.11n, and 802.11ac use the more heavily regulated 4.915–5.825-GHz band. These are commonly referred to as the "2.4- and 5-GHz bands" in most sales literature. Each spectrum is subdivided into channels with a centre frequency and bandwidth, analogous to how radio and TV broadcast bands are subdivided.

The 2.4&-GHz band is divided into 14 channels spaced 5 MHz apart, beginning with channel 1, which is centred on 2.412 GHz. The latter channels have additional restrictions or are unavailable for use in some regulatory domains.

Graphical representation of Wi-Fi channels in the 2.4-GHz band

The channel numbering of the 5.725–5.875 GHz spectrum is less intuitive due to the differences in regulations between countries. These are discussed in greater detail on the list of WLAN channels.

=== Channel spacing within the 2.4-GHz band ===
In addition to specifying the channel centre frequency, 802.11 also specifies (in Clause 17) a spectral mask defining the permitted power distribution across each channel. The mask requires the signal to be attenuated a minimum of 20 dB from its peak amplitude at ±11 MHz from the centre frequency, the point at which a channel is effectively 22 MHz wide. One consequence is that stations can use only every fourth or fifth channel without overlap.

Availability of channels is regulated by country, constrained in part by how each country allocates radio spectrum to various services. At one extreme, Japan permits the use of all 14 channels for 802.11b, and 1–13 for 802.11g/n-2.4. Other countries such as Spain initially allowed only channels 10 and 11, and France allowed only 10, 11, 12, and 13; however, Europe now allow channels 1 through 13. North America and some Central and South American countries allow only 1 through 11.

Spectral masks for 802.11g channels 1–14 in the 2.4-GHz band

Since the spectral mask defines only power output restrictions up to ±11 MHz from the centre frequency to be attenuated by −50 dBr, it is often assumed that the energy of the channel extends no further than these limits. It is more correct to say that the overlapping signal on any channel should be sufficiently attenuated to interfere with a transmitter on any other channel minimally, given the separation between channels. Due to the near–far problem a transmitter can impact (desensitize) a receiver on a "non-overlapping" channel, but only if it is close to the victim receiver (within a metre) or operating above allowed power levels. Conversely, a sufficiently distant transmitter on an overlapping channel can have little to no significant effect.

Confusion often arises over the amount of channel separation required between transmitting devices. 802.11b was based on direct-sequence spread spectrum (DSSS) modulation and utilized a channel bandwidth of 22 MHz, resulting in three "non-overlapping" channels (1, 6, and 11). 802.11g was based on OFDM modulation and utilized a channel bandwidth of 20 MHz. This occasionally leads to the belief that four "non-overlapping" channels (1, 5, 9, and 13) exist under 802.11g. However, this is not the case as per 17.4.6.3 Channel Numbering of operating channels of the IEEE Std 802.11 (2012), which states, "In a multiple cell network topology, overlapping and/or adjacent cells using different channels can operate simultaneously without interference if the distance between the center frequencies is at least 25 MHz." and section 18.3.9.3 and Figure 18-13.

This does not mean that the technical overlap of the channels recommends the non-use of overlapping channels. The amount of inter-channel interference seen on a configuration using channels 1, 5, 9, and 13 (which is permitted in Europe, but not in North America) is barely different from a three-channel configuration, but with an entire extra channel.

802.11 non-overlapping channels in the 2.4-GHz ISM band

However, overlap between channels with more narrow spacing (e.g., 1, 4, 7, 11 in North America) may cause unacceptable degradation of signal quality and throughput, particularly when users transmit near the boundaries of AP cells.

=== Regulatory domains and legal compliance ===
IEEE uses the phrase regdomain to refer to a legal regulatory region. Different countries define different levels of allowable transmitter power, time that a channel can be occupied, and different available channels. Domain codes are specified for the United States, Canada, ETSI (Europe), Spain, France, Japan, and China.

Most Wi-Fi certified devices default to regdomain 0, which means least common denominator settings, i.e., the device will not transmit at a power above the allowable power in any nation, nor will it use frequencies that are not permitted in any nation.

The regdomain setting is often made difficult or impossible to change so that the end-users do not conflict with local regulatory agencies such as the United States' Federal Communications Commission.

== Layer 2 – Datagrams ==
The datagrams are called frames. Current 802.11 standards specify frame types for use in the transmission of data as well as management and control of wireless links.

Frames are divided into very specific and standardized sections. Each frame consists of a MAC header, payload, and frame check sequence (FCS). Some frames do not have payloads.

Field	Frame control	Duration, id.	Address; 1	Address; 2	Address; 3	Sequence control	Address; 4	QoS control	HT control	Frame body	Frame check sequence
Length (Bytes)	2	2	6	6	6	0, or 2	6	0, or 2	0, or 4	Variable	4

The first two bytes of the MAC header form a frame control field specifying the form and function of the frame. This frame control field is subdivided into the following sub-fields:

- Protocol Version: Two bits representing the protocol version. The currently used protocol version is zero. Other values are reserved for future use.
- Type: Two bits identifying the type of WLAN frame. Control, Data, and Management are various frame types defined in IEEE 802.11.
- Subtype: Four bits providing additional discrimination between frames. Type and Subtype are used together to identify the exact frame.
- ToDS and FromDS: Each is one bit in size. They indicate whether a data frame is headed for a distribution system or it is getting out of it. Control and management frames set these values to zero. All the data frames will have one of these bits set.
  - ToDS = 0 and FromDS = 0
    - Communication within a basic service set or an independent basic service set (IBSS) network.
  - ToDS = 0 and FromDS = 1
    - A frame sent by a station and directed to an AP accessed via the distribution system.
  - ToDS = 1 and FromDS = 0
    - A frame exiting the distribution system for a station.
  - ToDS = 1 and FromDS = 1
    - Only kind of frame that uses all four MAC addresses in a DATA frame.
    - Address 1: access point address exiting from the distribution system.
    - Address 2: access point entrance to the distribution system (AP to which the source station is connected).
    - Address 3: final station address.
    - Address 4: address of the source station.
- More Fragments: The More Fragments bit is set when a packet is divided into multiple frames for transmission. Every frame except the last frame of a packet will have this bit set.
- Retry: Sometimes frames require retransmission, and for this, there is a Retry bit that is set to one when a frame is resent. This aids in the elimination of duplicate frames.
- Power Management: This bit indicates the power management state of the sender after the completion of a frame exchange. Access points are required to manage the connection and will never set the power-saver bit.
- More Data: The More Data bit is used to buffer frames received in a distributed system. The access point uses this bit to facilitate stations in power-saver mode. It indicates that at least one frame is available and addresses all stations connected.
- Protected Frame: The Protected Frame bit is set to the value of one if the frame body is encrypted by a protection mechanism such as Wired Equivalent Privacy (WEP), Wi-Fi Protected Access (WPA), or Wi-Fi Protected Access II (WPA2).
- Order: This bit is set only when the "strict ordering" delivery method is employed. Frames and fragments are not always sent in order as it causes a transmission performance penalty.

The next two bytes are reserved for the Duration ID field, indicating how long the field's transmission will take, so other devices know when the channel will be available again. This field can take one of three forms: Duration, Contention-Free Period (CFP), and Association ID (AID).

An 802.11 frame can have up to four address fields. Each field can carry a MAC address. Address 1 is the receiver, Address 2 is the transmitter, Address 3 is used for filtering purposes by the receiver. Address 4 is only present in data frames transmitted between access points in an Extended Service Set or between intermediate nodes in a mesh network.

The remaining fields of the header are:

- The Sequence Control field is a two-byte section used to identify message order and eliminate duplicate frames. The first 4 bits are used for the fragmentation number, and the last 12 bits are the sequence number.
- An optional two-byte Quality of Service control field, present in QoS Data frames; it was added with 802.11e.

The payload or frame body field is variable in size, from 0 to 2304 bytes plus any overhead from security encapsulation, and contains information from higher layers.

The Frame Check Sequence (FCS) is the last four bytes in the standard 802.11 frame. Often referred to as the Cyclic Redundancy Check (CRC), it allows for integrity checks of retrieved frames. As frames are about to be sent, the FCS is calculated and appended. When a station receives a frame, it can calculate the FCS of the frame and compare it to the one received. If they match, it is assumed that the frame was not distorted during transmission.

=== Management frames ===
Management frames are not always authenticated, and allow for the maintenance or discontinuance of communication. Some common 802.11 subtypes include:

- Authentication frame: 802.11 authentication begins with the wireless network interface controller (WNIC) sending an authentication frame to the access point containing its identity.
  - When open system authentication is being used, the WNIC sends only a single authentication frame, and the access point responds with an authentication frame of its own indicating acceptance or rejection.
  - When shared key authentication is being used, the WNIC sends an initial authentication request, and the access point responds with an authentication frame containing challenge text. The WNIC then sends an authentication frame containing the encrypted version of the challenge text to the access point. The access point confirms the text was encrypted with the correct key by decrypting it with its own key. The result of this process determines the WNIC's authentication status.
- Association request frame: Sent from a station, it enables the access point to allocate resources and synchronize. The frame carries information about the WNIC, including supported data rates and the SSID of the network the station wishes to associate with. If the request is accepted, the access point reserves memory and establishes an association ID for the WNIC.
- Association response frame: Sent from an access point to a station containing the acceptance or rejection to an association request. If it is an acceptance, the frame will contain information such as an association ID and supported data rates.
- Beacon frame: Sent periodically from an access point to announce its presence and provide the SSID and other parameters for WNICs within range.
- Deauthentication frame: Sent from a station wishing to terminate connection with another station.
- Disassociation frame: Sent from a station wishing to terminate the connection. It is an elegant way to allow the access point to relinquish memory allocation and remove the WNIC from the association table.
- Probe request frame: Sent from a station when it requires information from another station.
- Probe response frame: Sent from an access point containing capability information, supported data rates, etc., after receiving a probe request frame.
- Reassociation request frame: A WNIC sends a reassociation request when it drops from the currently associated access point range and finds another access point with a stronger signal. The new access point coordinates the forwarding of any information that may still be contained in the buffer of the previous access point.
- Reassociation response frame: Sent from an access point containing the acceptance or rejection of a WNIC reassociation request frame. The frame includes information required for association, such as the association ID and supported data rates.
- Action frame: extending management frame to control a certain action. Some of the action categories are QoS, Block Ack, Public, Radio Measurement, Fast BSS Transition, Mesh Peering Management, etc. These frames are sent by a station when it needs to tell its peer of a certain action to be taken. For example, a station can tell another station to set up a block acknowledgement by sending an ADDBA Request action frame. The other station would then respond with an ADDBA Response action frame.

The body of a management frame consists of frame-subtype-dependent fixed fields followed by a sequence of information elements (IEs).

The common structure of an IE is as follows:

Field	Type	Length	Data
Length	1	1	1–252

=== Control frames ===
Control frames facilitate the exchange of data frames between stations. Some common 802.11 control frames include:

- Acknowledgement (ACK) frame: After receiving a data frame, the receiving station will send an ACK frame to the sending station if no errors are found. If the sending station does not receive an ACK frame within a predetermined period of time, the sending station will resend the frame.
- Request to Send (RTS) frame: The RTS and CTS frames provide an optional collision reduction scheme for access points with hidden stations. A station sends an RTS frame as the first step in a two-way handshake required before sending data frames.
- Clear to Send (CTS) frame: A station responds to an RTS frame with a CTS frame. It provides clearance for the requesting station to send a data frame. The CTS provides collision control management by including a time value for which all other stations are to hold off transmission while the requesting station transmits.

=== Data frames ===
Data frames carry packets from web pages, files, etc., within the body.

For most PHYs, the body begins with an IEEE 802.2 header, with the Destination Service Access Point (DSAP) specifying the protocol, followed by a Subnetwork Access Protocol (SNAP) header if the DSAP is hex AA, with the organizationally unique identifier (OUI) and protocol ID (PID) fields specifying the protocol. If the OUI is all zeroes, the protocol ID field is an EtherType value. Almost all 802.11 data frames use 802.2 and SNAP headers, and most use an OUI of 00:00:00 and an EtherType value.

For the 5.9 GHz PHY (802.11p), the body begins with an EtherType field, and here is no 802.2 header.

Similar to TCP congestion control on the internet, frame loss is built into the operation of 802.11. To select the correct transmission speed or Modulation and Coding Scheme, a rate control algorithm may test different speeds. The actual packet loss rate of Access points varies widely for different link conditions. There are variations in the loss rate experienced on production Access points, between 10% and 80%, with 30% being a common average. It is important to be aware that the link layer should recover these lost frames. If the sender does not receive an Acknowledgement (ACK) frame, then it will be resent.

== Standards and amendments ==
Within the IEEE 802.11 Working Group, the following IEEE Standards Association Standards and Amendments exist:

- IEEE 802.11-1997: The WLAN standard was originally 1 Mbit/s and 2 Mbit/s, 2.4 GHz RF and infrared (IR) standard (1997), all the others listed below are Amendments to this standard, except for Recommended Practices 802.11F and 802.11T.
- IEEE 802.11a: 54 Mbit/s, 5 GHz standard (1999, shipping products in 2001)
- IEEE 802.11b: 5.5 Mbit/s and 11 Mbit/s, 2.4 GHz standard (1999)
- IEEE 802.11c: Bridge operation procedures; included in the IEEE 802.1D standard (2001)
- IEEE 802.11d: International (country-to-country) roaming extensions (2001)
- IEEE 802.11e: Enhancements: QoS, including packet bursting (2005)
- IEEE 802.11F: Inter-Access Point Protocol (2003) _{Withdrawn February 2006}
- IEEE 802.11g: 54 Mbit/s, 2.4 GHz standard (backwards compatible with b) (2003)
- IEEE 802.11h: Spectrum Managed 802.11a (5 GHz) for European compatibility (2004)
- IEEE 802.11i: Enhanced security (2004)
- IEEE 802.11j: Extensions for Japan (4.9-5.0 GHz) (2004)
- IEEE 802.11-2007: A new release of the standard that includes amendments a, b, d, e, g, h, i, and j. (July 2007)
- IEEE 802.11k: Radio resource measurement enhancements (2008)
- IEEE 802.11n: Higher Throughput WLAN at 2.4 and 5 GHz; 20 and 40 MHz channels; introduces MIMO to Wi-Fi (September 2009)
- IEEE 802.11p: WAVE—Wireless Access for the Vehicular Environment (such as ambulances and passenger cars) (July 2010)
- IEEE 802.11r: Fast BSS transition (FT) (2008)
- IEEE 802.11s: Mesh Networking, Extended Service Set (ESS) (July 2011)
- IEEE 802.11T: Wireless Performance Prediction (WPP)—test methods and metrics Recommendation _{cancelled}
- IEEE 802.11u: Improvements related to HotSpots and 3rd-party authorization of clients, e.g., cellular network offload (February 2011)
- IEEE 802.11v: Wireless network management (February 2011)
- IEEE 802.11w: Protected Management Frames (September 2009)
- IEEE 802.11y: 3650–3700 MHz Operation in the US (2008)
- IEEE 802.11z: Extensions to Direct Link Setup (DLS) (September 2010)
- IEEE 802.11-2012: A new release of the standard that includes amendments k, n, p, r, s, u, v, w, y, and z (March 2012)
- IEEE 802.11aa: Robust streaming of Audio Video Transport Streams (June 2012) - see Stream Reservation Protocol
- IEEE 802.11ac: Very High Throughput WLAN at 5 GHz; (Note: Operation in the 2.4-GHz band is specified by 802.11n.) wider channels (80 and 160 MHz); Multi-user MIMO (down-link only) (December 2013)
- IEEE 802.11ad: Very High Throughput 60 GHz (December 2012) — see also WiGig
- IEEE 802.11ae: Prioritization of Management Frames (March 2012)
- IEEE 802.11af: TV Whitespace (February 2014)
- IEEE 802.11-2016: A new release of the standard that includes amendments aa, ac, ad, ae, and af (December 2016)
- IEEE 802.11ah: Sub-1 GHz licence exempt operation (e.g., sensor network, smart metering) (December 2016)
- IEEE 802.11ai: Fast Initial Link Setup (December 2016)
- IEEE 802.11aj: China Millimeter Wave (February 2018)
- IEEE 802.11ak: Transit Links within Bridged Networks (June 2018)
- IEEE 802.11aq: Pre-association Discovery (July 2018)
- IEEE 802.11-2020: A new release of the standard that includes amendments ah, ai, aj, ak, and aq (December 2020)
- IEEE 802.11ax: High Efficiency WLAN at 2.4, 5 and 6 GHz; (Note: 6 GHz operation only between Wi-Fi 6E devices.) introduces OFDMA to Wi-Fi (February 2021)
- IEEE 802.11ay: Enhancements for Ultra High Throughput in and around the 60 GHz Band (March 2021)
- IEEE 802.11az: Next Generation Positioning (March 2023)
- IEEE 802.11ba: Wake Up Radio (March 2021)
- IEEE 802.11bb: Light Communications (November 2023)
- IEEE 802.11bc: Enhanced Broadcast Service (February 2024)
- IEEE 802.11bd: Enhancements for Next Generation V2X (see also IEEE 802.11p) (March 2023)
- IEEE 802.11-2024: A new release of the standard that includes amendments ax, ay, az, ba, bb, bc and bd (September 2024)
- IEEE 802.11be: Extremely High Throughput (September 2024)
- IEEE 802.11bf: WLAN Sensing (May 2025)
- IEEE 802.11bh: Randomized and Changing MAC Addresses (September 2024)
- IEEE 802.11bi: Enhanced Data Privacy (October 2026)
- IEEE 802.11bk: 320 MHz Positioning (June 2025)

=== In process ===
- IEEE 802.11bn: Ultra High Reliability
- IEEE 802.11bp: Ambient Power Communication
- IEEE 802.11mf: 802.11 Accumulated Maintenance Changes
- IEEE 802.11bq: Integrated Millimeter Wave
- IEEE 802.11br: Enhanced Light Communication
- IEEE 802.11bt: Post Quantum Cryptography

802.11F and 802.11T are recommended practices rather than standards and are capitalized as such.

802.11m is used for standard maintenance. 802.11ma was completed for 802.11-2007, 802.11mb for 802.11-2012, 802.11mc for 802.11-2016, 802.11md for 802.11-2020, and 802.11me for 802.11-2024.

=== Standard vs. amendment ===
Both the terms "standard" and "amendment" are used when referring to the different variants of IEEE standards.

As far as the IEEE Standards Association is concerned, there is only one current standard; it is denoted by IEEE 802.11 followed by the date published. IEEE 802.11-2024 is the only version currently in publication, superseding previous releases. The standard is updated by means of amendments. Amendments are created by task groups (TG). Both the task group and their finished document are denoted by 802.11 followed by one or two lowercase letters, for example, IEEE 802.11a or IEEE 802.11ax. Updating 802.11 is the responsibility of task group m. In order to create a new version, TGm combines the previous version of the standard and all published amendments. TGm also provides clarification and interpretation to industry on published documents. New versions of the IEEE 802.11 were published in 1999, 2007, 2012, 2016, 2020, and 2024.

== Nomenclature ==
Various terms in 802.11 are used to specify aspects of wireless local-area networking operation and may be unfamiliar to some readers.

For example, time unit (usually abbreviated TU) is used to indicate a unit of time equal to 1024 microseconds. Numerous time constants are defined in terms of TU (rather than the nearly equal millisecond).

Also, the term portal is used to describe an entity that is similar to an 802.1H bridge. A portal provides access to the WLAN by non-802.11 LAN STAs.

== Security ==
In 2001, a group from the University of California, Berkeley presented a paper describing weaknesses in the 802.11 Wired Equivalent Privacy (WEP) security mechanism defined in the original standard; they were followed by Fluhrer, Mantin, and Shamir's paper titled "Weaknesses in the Key Scheduling Algorithm of RC4". Not long after, Adam Stubblefield and AT&T publicly announced the first verification of the attack. In the attack, they were able to intercept transmissions and gain unauthorized access to wireless networks.

The IEEE set up a dedicated task group to create a replacement security solution, 802.11i (previously, this work was handled as part of a broader 802.11e effort to enhance the MAC layer). The Wi-Fi Alliance announced an interim specification called Wi-Fi Protected Access (WPA) based on a subset of the then-current IEEE 802.11i draft. These started to appear in products in mid-2003. IEEE 802.11i (also known as WPA2) itself was ratified in June 2004, and uses the Advanced Encryption Standard (AES), instead of RC4, which was used in WEP. The modern recommended encryption for the home/consumer space is WPA2 (AES Pre-Shared Key), and for the enterprise space is WPA2 along with a RADIUS authentication server (or another type of authentication server) and a strong authentication method such as EAP-TLS.

In January 2005, the IEEE set up yet another task group "w" to protect management and broadcast frames, which previously were sent unsecured. Its standard was published in 2009.

In December 2011, a security flaw was revealed that affects some wireless routers with a specific implementation of the optional Wi-Fi Protected Setup (WPS) feature. While WPS is not a part of 802.11, the flaw allows an attacker within the range of the wireless router to recover the WPS PIN and, with it, the router's 802.11i password in a few hours.

In late 2014, Apple announced that its iOS 8 mobile operating system would scramble MAC addresses during the pre-association stage to thwart retail footfall tracking made possible by the regular transmission of uniquely identifiable probe requests. Android 8.0 "Oreo" introduced a similar feature, named "MAC randomization".

Wi-Fi users may be subjected to a Wi-Fi deauthentication attack to eavesdrop, attack passwords, or force the use of another, usually more expensive access point.

== See also ==
- 802.11 frame types
- Comparison of wireless data standards
- Fujitsu Ltd. v. Netgear Inc.
- Gi-Fi, a term used by some trade press to refer to faster versions of the IEEE 802.11 standards
- LTE-WLAN Aggregation
- OFDM system comparison table
- Passive Wi-Fi
- Reference Broadcast Infrastructure Synchronization
- TU (time unit)
- TV White Space Database
- Ultra-wideband
- White spaces (radio)
- Wi-Fi operating system support
- Wibree or Bluetooth low energy
- WiGig
- Wireless USB – another wireless protocol primarily designed for shorter-range applications
