= Multiple access with collision avoidance =

Multiple access with collision avoidance (MACA) is a slotted media access control protocol used in wireless LAN data transmission to avoid collisions caused by the hidden station problem and to simplify exposed station problem.

The basic idea of MACA is a wireless network node makes an announcement before it sends the data frame to inform other nodes to keep silent. When a node wants to transmit, it sends a signal called Request-To-Send (RTS) with the length of the data frame to send. If the receiver allows the transmission, it replies the sender a signal called Clear-To-Send (CTS) with the length of the frame that is about to receive.
Meanwhile, a node that hears RTS should remain silent to avoid conflict with CTS; a node that hears CTS should keep silent until the data transmission is complete.

WLAN data transmission collisions may still occur, and the MACA for Wireless (MACAW) is introduced to extend the function of MACA. It requires nodes sending acknowledgements after each successful frame transmission, as well as the additional function of Carrier sense.
