= Evolved wireless ad hoc network =

Decentralized wireless network

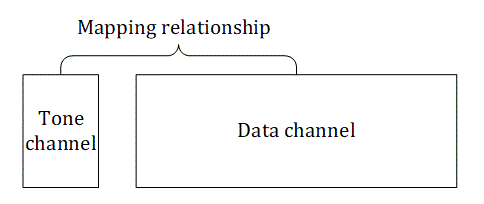
Dual channel structure of EVAN

An evolved wireless ad hoc network (EVAN) is a decentralized type of wireless network that compensates for the shortcomings of the existing wireless ad hoc network (WANET). An EVAN is ad hoc like a WANET because it does not rely on a pre-existing infrastructure, such as routers in wired networks or access points in wireless networks. Further advantages of WANETs over networks with a fixed topology include flexibility (an ad hoc network can be created anywhere with mobile devices), scalability (you can easily add more nodes to the network) and lower administration costs (no need to build an infrastructure first). These characteristics of WANETs are maintained in EVAN as well. However, an EVAN has a physically separate resource management channel called tone channel, unlike existing WANETs. In WANETs, the data channel performs two roles: resource management and data transfer, but in EVAN, the data channel is used only for data transfer.

== Challenges ==
Several books and works have revealed the technical and research challenges facing wireless ad hoc networks or MANETs. UEs moving in WANET rapidly change network topology. Many resources are used for channel management. A resource collision occurs when a UE allocates a resource or moves while occupying the resource. The UE in the middle experiences collisions due to packets being received simultaneously.

In summary:

- Dynamic network topology by mobile UEs
- Limited channel bandwidth
- Communication resource collision
- Hidden node problem

== Solution ==
To solve the problems, the tone channel is used. this channel is dedicated to resource management. The types of tones used in the tone channel include an allocation tone for allocating a resource, a clearing tone for occupying a resource, and a detection tone for detecting a collision of an occupied resource. These tones are transmitted in tone slots. A tone slot consists of multiple tone subslots where a tone is transmitted. A slot 'n' in a tone channel maps to a slot 'n+1' in a data channel. Therefore, a UE allocate tone slot 'n' to use data slot 'n+1'.

=== Dynamic network topology by mobile UEs ===
A UE occupying a resource in the data channel transmits a clearing tone in a tone slot related to the occupied resource. The UE occupying the data slot ‘n+1’ transmits a clearing tone in the tone slot ‘n-1’. By receiving one tone channel continuously, each UE can examine the resources occupied by other UEs in real time.

=== Limited channel bandwidth ===
In general, the bandwidth of the tone channel is much smaller than the bandwidth of the data channel. The larger the bandwidth of the data channel compared to the bandwidth of the tone channel, the closer the frequency efficiency is to 100%.

=== Communication resource collision ===
A resource collision occurs when a UE allocates a resource or when a UE moves while occupying a resource. The probability of collisions occurring when allocating resources is significantly improved compared to carrier-sense multiple access with collision avoidance (CSMA/CA). This improvement is due to the fact that an EVAN has two contention compared to CSMA/CA having one contention. The collision of occupied resources caused by movement is detected in real time by each UE transmitting and receiving multiple detection tones. Two UEs can transmit different detection tones than the other by randomly selecting the transmission detection tones. UEs sense the tones when they do not transmit a detection tone. Therefore, the detection tones sent by the other UE can be detected.

=== Hidden node problem ===
In general, the tone channel bandwidth is quite small compared to the data channel bandwidth. When the two channels have the same transmit power, the communication distance of the tone channel is more than twice that of the data channel. Thus, the tone channel collides before the data channel collides. Since tone channel collisions can be detected, the UE can prevent a data channel collision by selecting another channel resource without collision. This solves the hidden node problem.

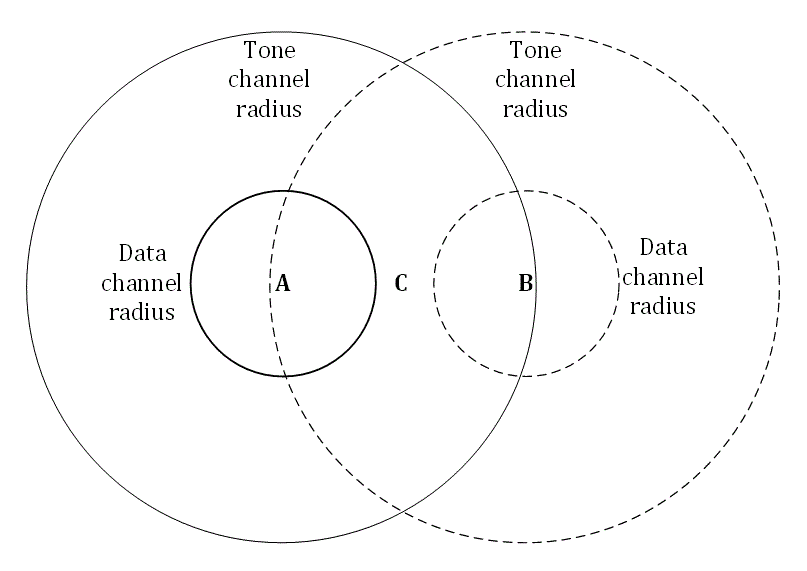
Solution to the hidden node problem - Tone channel collision before data channel collision

== Advantages ==
Existing WANETs must broadcast 1-hop channel information or receive signals from other UEs to notify collisions. In contrast, in EVAN, if the UE does not need to listen to broadcasts, the UE operates only in the data slot and tone slot it uses, and may be in sleep mode at other times. That is, in EVAN, a sleep mode is possible when UEs are not being used for routing. This makes an EVAN suitable for 1-hop-based services that do not require routing.

== Disadvantages ==
RF hardware for data channel and RF hardware for tone channel are required separately. Since the tone channel only performs a simple operation of transmitting or sensing a tone signal, the RF hardware of the tone channel is very simple.

== See also ==
- Ad hoc network
- Ad hoc wireless distribution service
- Carrier-sense multiple access with collision avoidance
- Wireless ad hoc network
- Wireless mesh network
