= Multiple Access with Collision Avoidance for Wireless =

Slotted medium access control protocol widely used in ad hoc networks

Multiple Access with Collision Avoidance for Wireless (MACAW) is a slotted medium access control (MAC) protocol widely used in ad hoc networks. Furthermore, it is the foundation of many other MAC protocols used in wireless sensor networks (WSN). The IEEE 802.11 RTS/CTS mechanism is adopted from this protocol. It uses RTS-CTS-DS-DATA-ACK frame sequence for transferring data, sometimes preceded by an RTS-RRTS frame sequence, in view to provide solution to the hidden node problem. Although protocols based on MACAW, such as S-MAC, use carrier sense in addition to the RTS/CTS mechanism, MACAW does not make use of carrier sense.

== Principles of operation ==
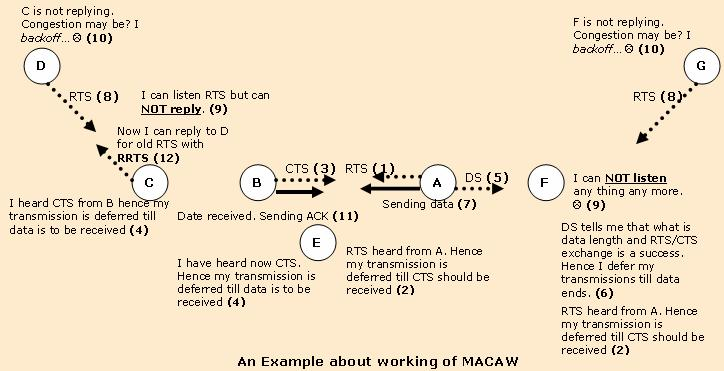
An example to illustrate the principle of MACAW. It is assumed that only adjacent nodes are in transmission range of each other.

Assume that node A has data to transfer to node B. Node A initiates the process by sending a Request to Send frame (RTS) to node B. The destination node (node B) replies with a Clear To Send frame (CTS). After receiving CTS, node A sends data. After successful reception, node B replies with an acknowledgement frame (ACK). If node A has to send more than one data fragment, it has to wait a random time after each successful data transfer and compete with adjacent nodes for the medium using the RTS/CTS mechanism.

Any node overhearing an RTS frame (for example node F or node E in the illustration) refrains from sending anything until a CTS is received, or after waiting a certain time. If the captured RTS is not followed by a CTS, the maximum waiting time is the RTS propagation time and the destination node turnaround time.

Any node (node C and node E) overhearing a CTS frame refrains from sending anything for the time until the data frame and ACK should have been received (solving the hidden terminal problem), plus a random time. Both the RTS and CTS frames contain information about the length of the DATA frame. Hence a node uses that information to estimate the time for the data transmission completion.

Before sending a long DATA frame, node A sends a short Data-Sending frame (DS), which provides information about the length of the DATA frame. Every station that overhears this frame knows that the RTS/CTS exchange was successful. An overhearing station (node F), which might have received RTS and DS but not CTS, defers its transmissions until after the ACK frame should have been received plus a random time.

To sum up, a successful data transfer (A to B) consists of the following sequence of frames:

1. “Request To Send” frame (RTS) from A to B
2. “Clear To Send” frame (CTS) from B to A
3. “Data Sending” frame (DS) from A to B
4. DATA fragment frame from A to B, and
5. Acknowledgement frame (ACK) from B to A.

MACAW is a non-persistent slotted protocol, meaning that after the medium has been busy, for example after a CTS message, the station waits a random time after the start of a time slot before sending an RTS. This results in fair access to the medium. If for example nodes A, B and C have data fragments to send after a busy period, they will have the same chance to access the medium since they are in transmission range of each other.

=== RRTS ===
Node D is unaware of the ongoing data transfer between node A and node B. Node D has data to send to node C, which is in the transmission range of node B. D initiates the process by sending an RTS frame to node C. Node C has already deferred its transmission until the completion of the current data transfer between node A and node B (to avoid co-channel interference at node B). Hence, even though it receives RTS from node D, it does not reply back with CTS. Node D assumes that its RTS was not successful because of collision and hence proceeds to back off (using an exponential backoff algorithm).

If A has multiple data fragments to send, the only instant when node D successfully can initiate a data transfer is during small gaps in between that node A has completed data transfer and completion of node B next CTS (for node A next data transfer request). However, due to the node D backoff time period the probability to capture the medium during this small time interval is not high. To increase the per-node fairness, MACAW introduces a new control message called "Request for Request to Send" (RRTS).

Now, when node C, which cannot reply earlier due to ongoing transmission between node A and node B, sends an RRTS message to node D during next contention period, the recipient of the RRTS (node D) immediately responds with an RTS and the normal message exchange is commenced. Other nodes overhearing an RRTS defer for two time slots, long enough to hear if a successful RTS–CTS exchange occurs.

To summarize, a transfer may in this case consist of the following sequence of frames between node D and C:

1. “Request To Send” frame (RTS) from D to C
2. “Request for Request to send” frame (RRTS) from C to D (after a short delay)
3. “Request To Send” frame (RTS) from D to C
4. “Clear To Send” frame (CTS) from C to D
5. “Data Sending” frame (DS) from D to C
6. DATA fragment frame from D to C,
7. Acknowledgement frame (ACK) from C to D

== Ongoing research ==
Additional back-off algorithms have been developed and researched to improve performance. The basic principle is based on the use of sequencing techniques where each node in the wireless network maintains a counter which limits the number attempts to less than or equal to the sequence number or use wireless channel states to control the access probabilities so that a node with a good channel state has a higher probability of contention success. This reduces the number of collisions.

=== Unsolved problems ===
MACAW does not generally solve the exposed terminal problem. Assume that node G has data to send to node F in our example. Node G has no information about the ongoing data transfer from A to B. It initiates the process by sending an RTS signal to node F. Node F is in the transmission range of node A and cannot hear the RTS from node G, since it is exposed to co-channel interference. Node G assumes that its RTS was not successful because of collision and hence backs off before it tries again. In this case, the solution provided by the RRTS mechanism will not improve the situation much since the DATA frames sent from B are rather long compared to the other frames. The probability that F is exposed to transmission from A is rather high. Node F has no idea about any node interested in initiating data transfer to it, until G happens to transmit an RTS in between transmissions from A.

Furthermore, MACAW might not behave normally in multicasting.

== See also ==
- Multiple Access with Collision Avoidance (MACA)
