= 54321 =

54321 may refer to:

- 54321 (film), a 2016 Tamil-language film
- "54321" (song), a 2022 song by Offset
- "5-4-3-2-1", a song by Manfred Mann
- 5-4-3 rule or 5-4-3-2-1 rule, an Ethernet design guideline
- Countdown, a sequence of backward counting towards a scheduled event
