= Ad hoc wireless distribution service =

Routing protocol for mobile ad hoc networks

Ad hoc Wireless Distribution Service (AWDS) is a layer 2 routing protocol to connect mobile ad hoc networks, sometimes called wireless mesh networks. It is based on a link-state routing protocol, similar to OLSR.

== Principle of operation ==
AWDS uses a link-state routing protocol for organizing the network. In contrast to other implementations like OLSR it operates in layer 2. That means no IP addresses must be assigned because the unique MAC addresses of the WLAN hardware is used instead. Furthermore, all kinds of layer 3 protocols can be used, like IP, DHCP, IPv6, IPX, etc. The protocol daemon creates a virtual network interface, which can be used by the kernel like a typical LAN interface.

== Alternatives ==
The list of ad hoc routing protocols contains a large set of alternatives. However, most of them are academic and do not exist as practical implementations.

== See also ==
- Evolved wireless ad hoc network
