= Ron Crane =

Ron Crane may refer to:

- Ron Crane (engineer) (1950–2017), American electrical engineer
- Ron Crane (politician) (born 1948), American politician in Idaho
