= Cellemetry Data Services =

Cellemetry Data Services, abbreviated Cellemetry and stylized Cellemetry^{sm}, was a cellular-telephony-based Internet of things network introduced commercially in 1996. Cellemetry was designed to operate over the existing cellular network, allowing it to be rapidly deployed.

== History ==
Cellemetry was invented by Peter Roach, Scott Laster, and Ed Comer in 1994 while working for BellSouth^{sm}. BellSouth^{sm} partnered with Numerex^{sm} to offer Cellemetry and Numerex eventually acquired the rights to Cellemetry data service. Numerex^{sm} was eventually acquired by Sierra Wireless. The Cellemetry network was decommissioned when the cellular network transitioned from analog to digital cellular. Sierra Wireless still uses the Cellemetry name, with a different technology.

== Products and technology ==
Cellemetry operated by sending messages over the signalling channel of the analog cellular network. It used a non-dialable telephone number as the device identifier and inserted a device generated data message in place of the phone serial number. The Cellemetry device would then send out a registration message to the home cellular system. The Cellemetry message would then transverse the SS7) signaling network along with normal traffic. When the message arrived at the home cellular system, a specialized server would act as the home location register (HLR) and would take the message off of the cellular network and send it to the intended application or application service provider.

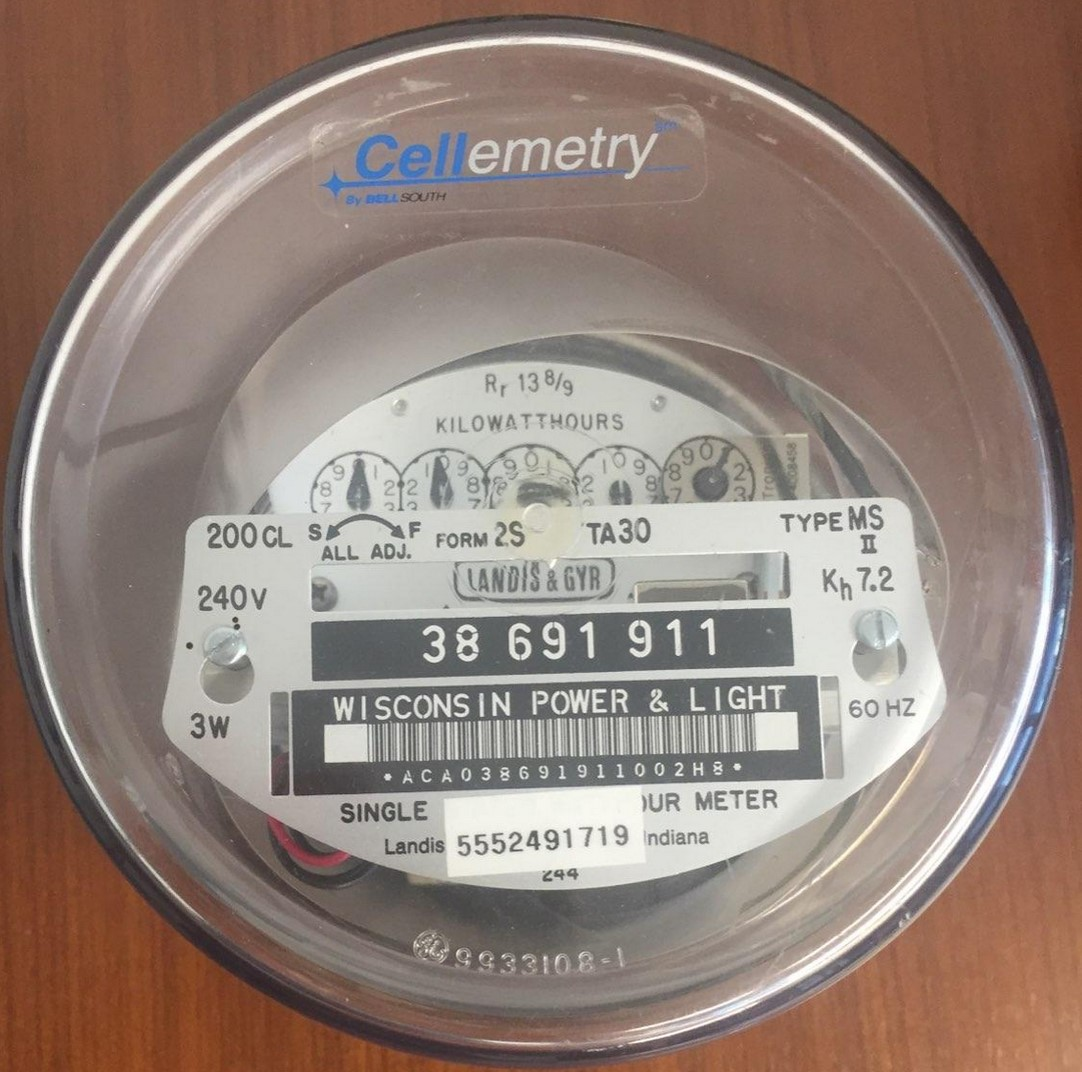
Cellemetry Enabled Power Meter

For an outbound message, the Cellemetry server would receive a message from an application or service provider, and then send a 'ring' signal to the device as if it was ringing a normal cellular telephone.

The inbound channel (device to the network) channel was much more robust than the outbound channel (network to device). Outbound messages were generally restricted to trigger messages that caused a large number of devices to perform an action, report status, or other similar action. For example, an outbound messages might cause a set of vending machines to report their inventory level, change pricing, etc. Later versions of Cellemetry used other signaling messages such as USSD messages as the outbound messaging mechanism.

Cellemetry had a number of advantages that led to its widespread adoption worldwide.

- CSMA-style channel sharing with exponential backoff.
- Since the Cellemetry messages were carried over the cell site signaling channel, they tended to have a higher coverage than cellular voice calls. This was mainly due to the architecture of the signaling channel where the messages are repeated several times (typically three) and included check bits. This allowed Cellemetry devices to be placed further into buildings or on the edge of the cellular coverage were normal voice calls may not have been possible
- Cellemetry devices utilized many of the components of a traditional analog cellular telephone. This allowed the Cellemetry devices to take advantages of the cost efficiencies of the rapidly growing cellular telephone base. Many early Cellemetry modems were analog cellular telephones without the human interface or the case.

As the analog cellular network was phased out, the analog Cellemetry devices were eventually discontinued or transitioned to the GSM network using a different technology.

== Legacy ==
Cellemetry was used for monitoring and control of:

- Highway crash attenuators, traffic control signal, flood water, and tower beacons
- Railroad equipment / signals
- Public busses
- School buses
- Automatic vehicle location and wireless information systems
- Trucks
- Alarm systems
- Shipping container location
- Refrigerated transport
- Vending machines
- Galvanic corrosion for pipelines
