= IEEE 802.11 RTS/CTS =

Computer network protocol

IEEE 802.11 RTS/CTS (request to send/clear to send) is the optional mechanism used by the 802.11 wireless networking protocol to reduce frame collisions introduced by the hidden node problem. Originally the protocol fixed the exposed node problem as well, but later RTS/CTS does not, but includes ACKs.

== Frame format ==
The RTS, CTS and ACK frame headers all contain

- frame control (two bytes of metadata flags)
- duration
- receiver MAC address
- frame check sequence.
- RTS frames contain the transmitter's MAC address.

== Exposed terminal problem ==
This protocol was designed under the assumption that all nodes have the same transmission ranges. RTS/CTS frames can cause the exposed terminal problem in which a wireless node that is nearby, but is associated with another access point, overhears the exchange and then is signaled to back off and cease transmitting for the time specified in the RTS.

== Carrier sensing ==
RTS/CTS is an additional method to implement virtual carrier sensing in carrier sense multiple access with collision avoidance (CSMA/CA). By default, 802.11 relies on physical carrier sensing only.

== Frame size ==
The RTS/CTS packet size threshold is 0–2347 octets. Typically, sending RTS/CTS frames does not occur unless the packet size exceeds this threshold. If the packet size that the node wants to transmit is larger than the threshold, the RTS/CTS handshake gets triggered. Otherwise, the data frame gets sent immediately.

== See also ==
- RS-232 RTS/CTS - RS-232 RTS/CTS flow control
- Multiple Access with Collision Avoidance for Wireless
