= Ron Crane (engineer) =

American electrical engineer (1950–2017)

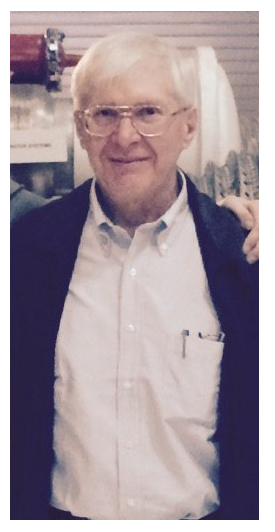
- Born: June 1, 1950
- Died: June 19, 2017 (aged 67)
- Citizenship: United States
- Education: MIT (BS); Stanford University (MS)
- Occupation: Electrical engineer
- Known for: Invention of the EtherLink controller; 3com co-founder; Ethernet co-inventor
- Spouse: Rosanne Kermoian Crane (m. 2017)
- Scientific career
- Fields: Computer networking
- Workplaces: Xerox PARC; 3Com; LAN Media

Ronald Cooper Crane (June 1, 1950 - June 19, 2017) was an American electrical engineer recognized for designing the EtherLink, the first network interface controller for the IBM PC. He was also a co-founder of 3Com and a co-inventor of Ethernet.

== Biography ==
Crane graduated from the Massachusetts Institute of Technology in 1972 with a Bachelor of Science degree in electrical engineering. He then attended Stanford University initially planning to pursue a doctorate degree in electrical engineering. In 1973, while pursuing his doctorate degree at Stanford, Crane joined the TCP/IP protocol research team, headed by Vint Cerf. In 2005, a "Birth of the Internet" plaque was installed on the Stanford grounds, and Crane's name, among others, is listed on the plaque as being a fundamental contributor to the birth of the Internet.

Crane left Stanford in 1974, accepting a Master of Science degree in electrical engineering instead of his planned doctorate degree, and began to work at the Xerox Systems Development Division, a spinoff of Xerox PARC, where he was responsible for enhancing the original Ethernet transmission system. Crane joined Bob Metcalfe at 3Com as the fourth employee and co-founder in 1979. It was at 3Com where Crane developed the 3C100, the first Thick Ethernet transceiver for the IBM PC, which went on to be the first major product offered by 3Com.

Crane founded LAN Media Corporation in 1992. It was later acquired by SBE Incorporated in 2000, which was, in turn, acquired by Neonode in 2007.

In 2006, Crane endowed a professorship at MIT to support energy-related research.

Crane died on June 19, 2017, from complications of an aggressive form of prostate cancer. A memorial event was held at the Computer History Museum and attended by over 100 esteemed colleagues, friends and family. Bob Metcalfe gave the closing speech.

In 2019, a book entitled "The 3Com story" was published, that, in part, documents Crane's contributions to networking and 3Com.

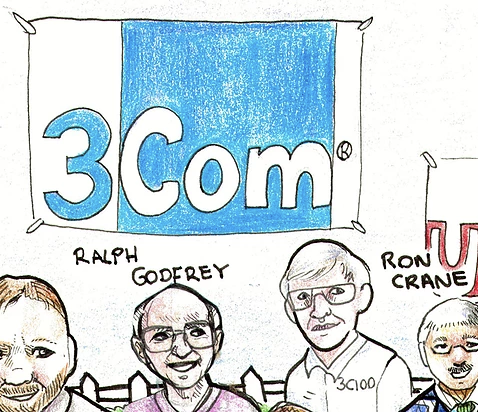
