= Ethernet =

Open standard family of wired computer networking protocols

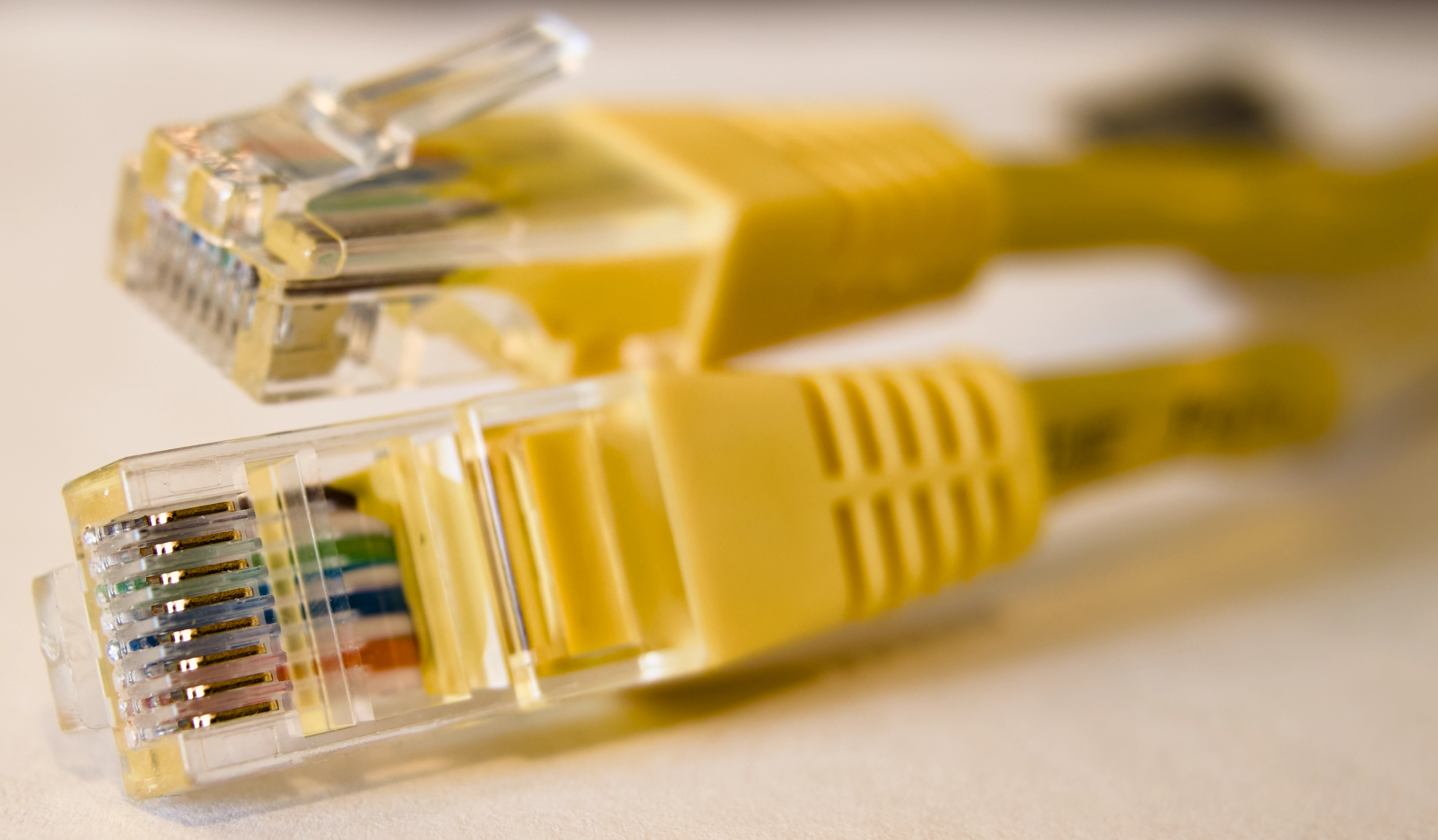
- 8P8C modular connector on twisted-pair cable often used for Ethernet
- International standard: IEEE 802.3
- Developed by: Robert Metcalfe and David Boggs at Xerox PARC
- Introduced: 11 November 1973; 53 years ago
- Industry: Information technology
- Connector type: 8P8C modular connector; Compatible optical fiber connectors
- Compatible hardware: Personal computers, video game consoles, printers, routers, automotive electronics
- 30-100 meters (twisted pair copper Cat cable). 40 km (Extended Reach optical fiber)

Symbol used by Apple and Google on some devices to denote an Ethernet connection

Symbol recommended by Microsoft as part of the PC System Design Guide to denote an Ethernet connection

Ethernet (/ˈiːθərnɛt/ EE-thər-net) is a family of wired computer networking standards designed for (but not limited to) local area networks (LAN), access networks, and metropolitan area networks (MAN). It was commercially introduced in 1980 and first standardized in 1983 as ECMA-82 and shortly after as IEEE 802.3. It is an example of an open standard.

Ethernet has since been refined to support higher bit rates, a greater number of nodes, and longer link distances, but retains much backward compatibility. Over time, Ethernet has largely replaced competing wired LAN technologies such as Token Ring, FDDI and ARCNET.

The original 10BASE5 Ethernet uses a thick coaxial cable as a shared medium. Its immediate successor 10BASE2 uses a thinner and more flexible cable that is both less expensive and easier to use. More modern Ethernet variants use twisted pair and fiber optic links in conjunction with switches. Over the course of its history, Ethernet data transfer rates have been increased from the original 2.94 Mbit/s to the latest 800 Gbit/s, with rates up to 1.6 Tbit/s under development. The Ethernet standards include several wiring and signaling variants of the OSI physical layer.

Systems communicating over Ethernet divide a stream of data into shorter pieces called frames. Each frame contains source and destination addresses, and error-checking data so that damaged frames can be detected and discarded; most often, higher-layer protocols trigger retransmission of lost frames. Per the OSI model, Ethernet provides services up to and including the data link layer. The 48-bit MAC address was adopted by other IEEE 802 networking standards, including IEEE 802.11 (Wi-Fi), as well as by FDDI. EtherType values are also used in Subnetwork Access Protocol (SNAP) headers.

Ethernet is widely used in homes and industry, and interworks well with wireless Wi-Fi technologies. Ethernet commonly carries Internet Protocol traffic, and so Ethernet is considered one of the key technologies that make up the Internet.

== History ==
The original forms of Ethernet used a shared communications channel. This concept originated in ALOHAnet, designed in the late 1960s by Norman Abramson. ALOHAnet was a 4800 bit/s radio network used by the University of Hawaii. When a sender detected that its message hadn't been received, it would resend the message after waiting for a randomly selected period of time.

In 1972, Robert Metcalfe and David Boggs adapted the ALOHAnet approach to transmission over a shared coaxial cable in the Xerox PARC (Xerox Palo Alto Research Center). Metcalfe was tasked with building a high-speed local network to connect the Xerox Alto prototype PCs to Xerox's prototype high-resolution laser printers and the Internet (then known as ARPANET). Metcalfe and Boggs' network connected Alto computers using a coaxial cable. In a 12-page memo written on May 22, 1973, Metcalfe named the concept "The Ether Network." The name was inspired by the former idea that the universe was filled with a "luminiferous aether" that carried electromagnetic waves, and calling it Ethernet emphasized its ability to run over any transmission medium. It first ran on November 11, 1973 with a bit rate of 2.94 Mbit/s. Ethernet improved the original ALOHAnet design because a sender would first listen to the channel to determine if it was already in use. The combination of the new idea of Carrier Sense with Multiple Access and Collision Detection from ALOHAnet became Carrier-Sense Multiple Access/Collision Detection, or CSMA/CD.

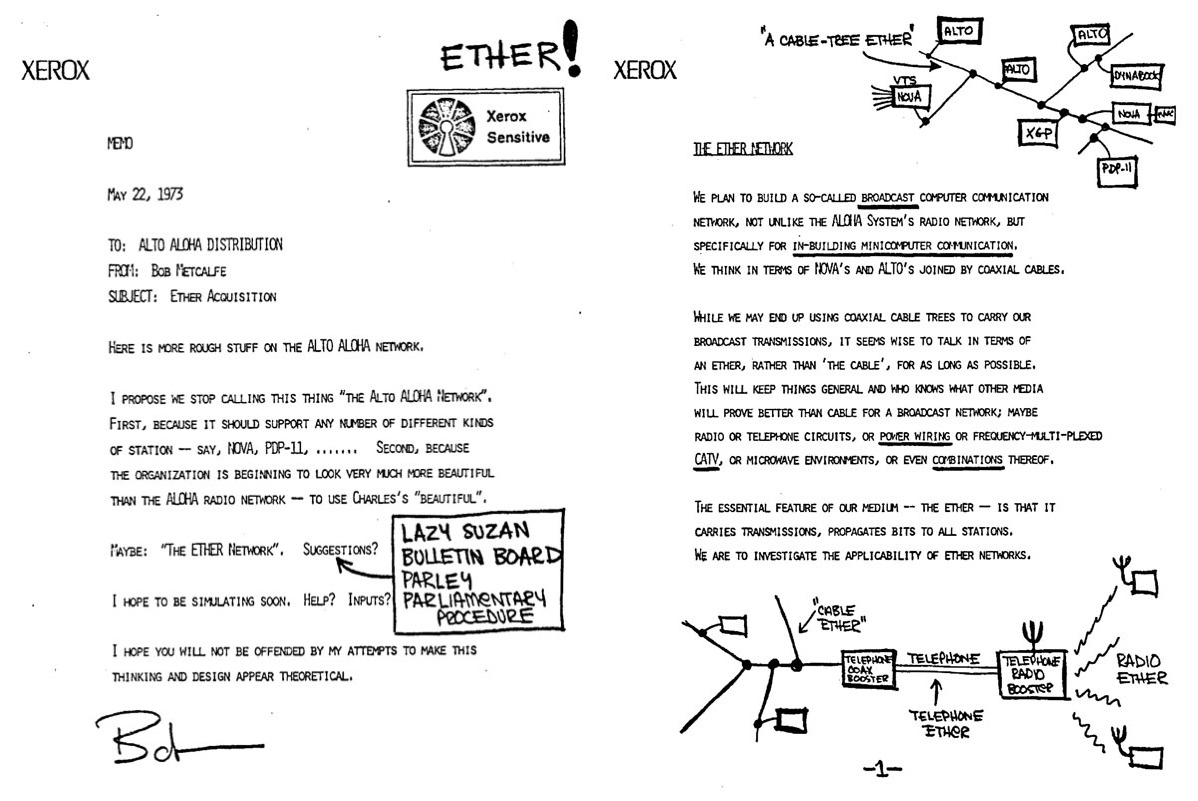
First pages of Xerox PARC memo authored by Metcalfe in 1973 establishing the basic principles of Ethernet.

In 1975, Metcalfe, Boggs and their colleagues Charles Thacker and Butler Lampson filed for a patent on Ethernet, which was granted in 1977. By 1976, 100 Altos at Xerox PARC were connected using Ethernet. In July 1976, Metcalfe and Boggs published the seminal paper Ethernet: Distributed Packet Switching for Local Computer Networks in Communications of the ACM (CACM). Subsequently, between 1976 and 1978 Ron Crane, Bob Garner, Hal Murray, and Roy Ogus designed a 10Mbit/s version of Ethernet running over coaxial cable.

There were multiple local area network technologies in the 1970s. These included IBM's Token Ring, Network Systems Corporation's HYPERchannel and Datapoint's ARCnet. All were proprietary at the time. Metcalfe, Gordon Bell, and David Liddle developed a strategy of standardizing Ethernet rather than keeping it vendor-specific, and convinced Digital Equipment Corporation (DEC), Intel, and Xerox to work together on a standard, subsequently known as the DIX standard, based on the 10Mbit/s version of Ethernet and published on September 30, 1980 as the Ethernet Blue Book. Version 2 was published in November 1982.

In June 1981, the Institute of Electronic and Electrical Engineers (IEEE) Project 802 (for local area network standards) created an 802.3 subcommittee to produce an Ethernet standard based on DIX. In 1983, a standard was published for 10 Mbit/s Ethernet over a coaxial cable of up to 500 meters (10BASE5). It differed only in some details from the DIX standard. As part of the standardization process, Xerox turned over all its Ethernet patents to the IEEE, and anyone can implement 802.3. IEEE 802.3 is now considered the same as Ethernet. The cooperation of Xerox with Intel and Digital on the Ethernet standard ultimately made it a truly open standard.

In June 1979, Metcalfe left Xerox to found the Computer, Communication, and Compatibility Corporation, better known as 3Com, along with Howard Charney, Ron Crane, Greg Shaw, and Bill Krause. Metcalfe's vision was to sell Ethernet adapters for all personal computers. Apple quickly agreed, but IBM was committed to their own LAN protocol, the Token Ring. Nonetheless, 3Com developed the EtherLink ISA adapter and started shipping it with DOS driver software, making it usable on IBM PCs.

The EtherLink adapter had several advantages over competitors. It was the first network interface card (NIC) to use VLSI semiconductor technology (developed in partnership with Seeq Technology). This meant most of the functions, including the transceiver, could be contained on a single chip, so the price for Etherlink ($950) was significantly lower than of its competitors. 3Com introduced a new, thinner coaxial cable for the card, called Thin Ethernet, making it more convenient to install and use. Finally, Etherlink was the first Ethernet adapter for the IBM PC.

Because both businesses and home users adopted the IBM PC, its market expanded rapidly, and by 1982, IBM was shipping 200,000 units a month. Since IBM hadn't realized that businesses would want the computers connected by a network, Etherlink sales filled the vacuum, and in 1984, 3Com was able to file for a public stock offering. The Etherlink approach was standardized by IEEE as 10BASE2 in 1984.

Also in the early 1980s, Novell began selling Network Interface Cards (NICs) to go with its NetWare operating system. These NE2000 NICs were all Ethernet, and because NetWare became an important application for businesses, this increased the demand for Ethernet adapters. Then in 1989, Novell sold its NIC business and licensed the NE2000 card, creating a highly competitive market and driving the price of Ethernet cards down, while cards for other technologies, such as IBM's Token Ring, remained high.

Starting in late 1983, AT&T and NCR promoted a star configuration using unshielded twisted pair cabling (UTP), or regular telephone wire. This became StarLAN, running at 1Mbit/s over cables up to 500 meters, and was standardized as 1BASE5 by IEEE 802.3, but on August 17, 1987, SynOptics introduced LATTISNET with 10Mbit/s Ethernet also over regular telephone wire (UTP). In the fall of 1990, the IEEE issued the 802.3i standard for 10BASE-T, Ethernet over twisted pairs, and the following year, Ethernet sales nearly doubled. By 1992, Ethernet was the de facto standard for LANs.

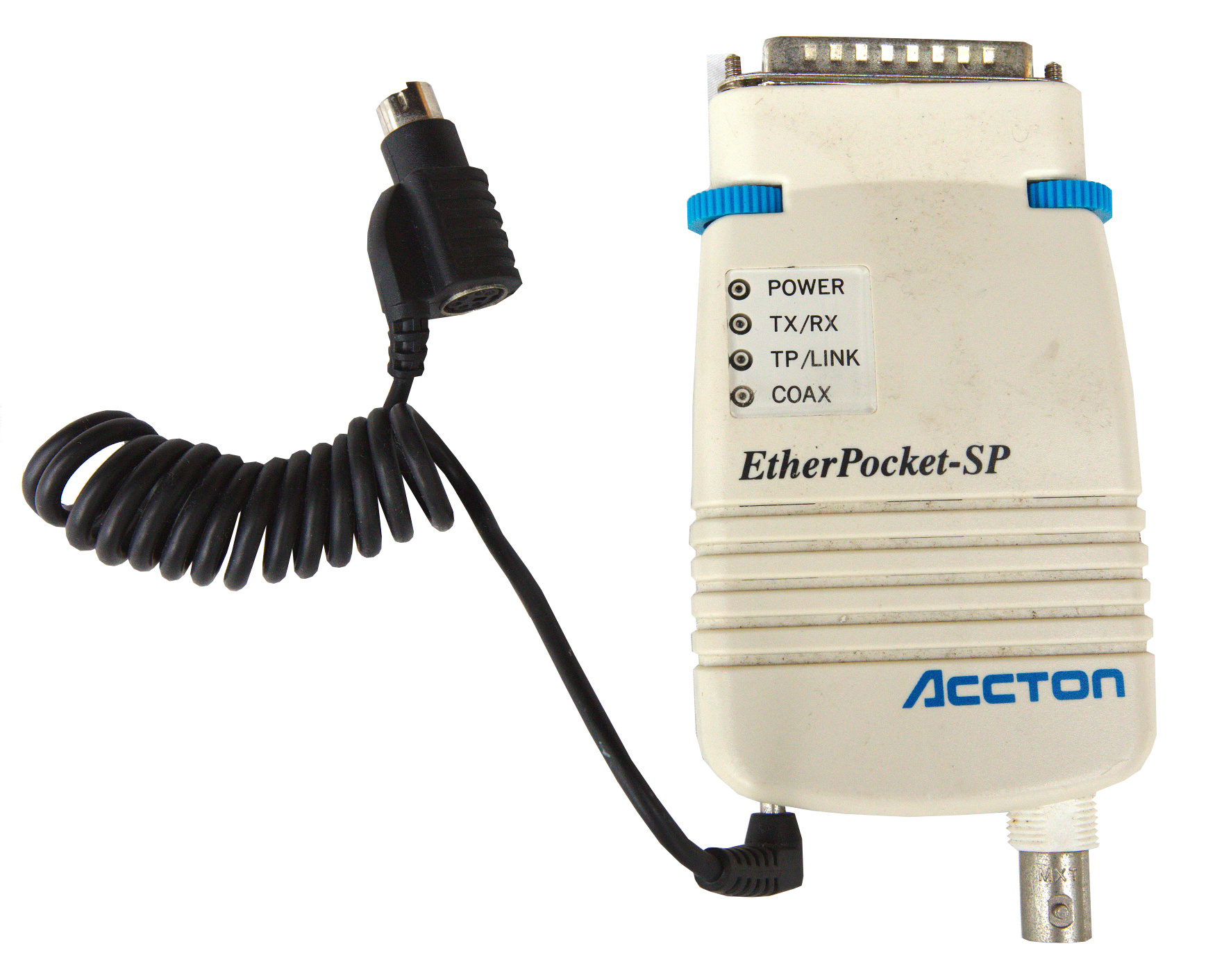
Accton Etherpocket-SP parallel port Ethernet adapter (c. 1990). Supports both coaxial (10BASE2) and twisted pair (10BASE-T) cables. Power is drawn from a PS/2 port passthrough cable.

In the 1990s, the proliferation of PCs combined with their increasing power drove demand for much faster network infrastructure. The Kalpana EtherSwitch EPS-700 helped to meet this demand by increasing the speed of Ethernet dramatically. The switch allowed multiple simultaneous data transmission paths and it used faster cut-through bridging technology in place of store-and-forward. The switch was marketed as a way to improve network performance rather than as a way to connect different LANs, creating a new market category. Then in 1993, Kalpana introduced full-duplex mode for switches, potentially doubling the data transmission rate. In 1997, the IEEE standardized full-duplex flow-control switched in 802.3x.

The 10Mbit/s rate of Ethernet was still too slow for some networks, though, and most larger networks planned to use FDDI, a very expensive alternative to Ethernet. In August 1991 Howard Charney, David Boggs, Ron Crane, and Larry Birenbaum founded Grand Junction Networks to build and market 100Mbit/s Ethernet equipment. Their announcement in 1992 triggered a standards war over whether to maintain backward compatibility with the original Ethernet CSMA/CD standard or to adopt a demand-priority protocol pushed by HP and AT&T. Since the competing groups were unable to come to an agreement, IEEE set up a new group, 802.12, for the demand-priority scheme. The supporters of backward compatibility formed the Fast Ethernet Alliance in 1993 to publish an interoperability specification that became the 100BASE-TX standard (also known as Fast Ethernet). At the same time, Grand Junction shipped the first Fast Ethernet hubs and NICs, and more companies announced Fast Ethernet equipment. In 1994, Sun Microsystems, followed by 3Com, DEC, and others, shipped 100BASE-TX compliant products, and the IEEE 802.3u specification for Fast Ethernet was approved.

Since 1999, Ethernet's maximum speed has increased with the introductions of Gigabit Ethernet (802.3ab), 2.5 and 5 Gbit/s Ethernet (802.3bz), 10 Gigabit Ethernet (802.3ae), 25 Gigabit Ethernet (802.3by), 50 Gigabit Ethernet (802.3cd), 100 Gigabit Ethernet (802.3ba), and Terabit Ethernet (802.3df).

== Standardization ==
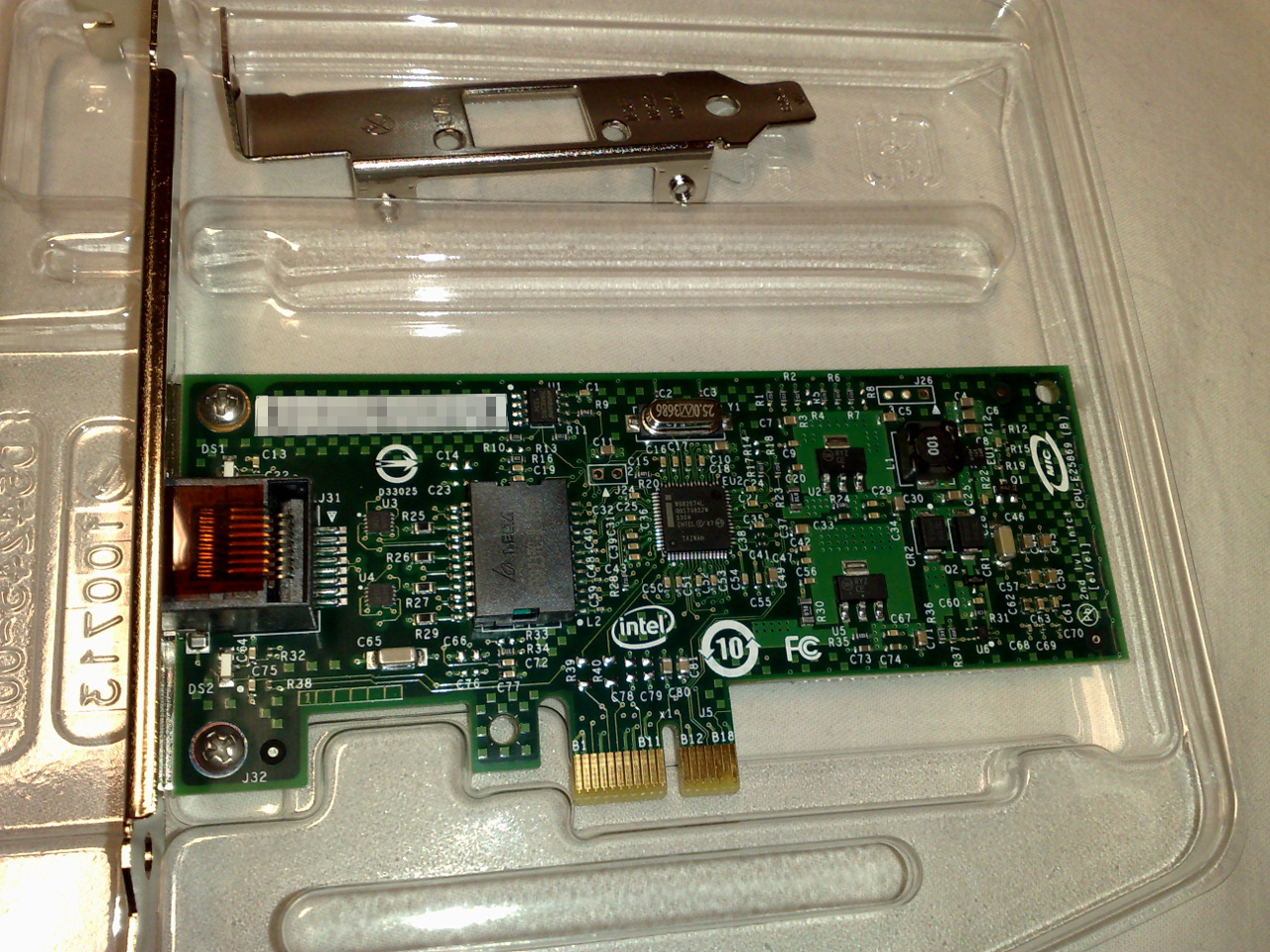
An Intel 82574L Gigabit Ethernet NIC, PCI Express ×1 card

In February 1980, the Institute of Electrical and Electronics Engineers (IEEE) started project 802 to standardize local area networks (LAN). The DIX group with Gary Robinson (DEC), Phil Arst (Intel), and Bob Printis (Xerox) submitted the so-called Blue Book CSMA/CD specification as a candidate for the LAN specification. In addition to CSMA/CD, Token Ring (supported by IBM) and Token Bus (selected and henceforward supported by General Motors) were also considered as candidates for a LAN standard. Competing proposals and broad interest in the initiative led to strong disagreement over which technology to standardize. In December 1980, the group was split into three subgroups, and standardization proceeded separately for each proposal.

The development of the CSMA/CD standard was slowed by conflict over issues such as baseband versus broadband and the lengths of address fields. Some members of the DIX group became impatient with the process and concerned that the ultimate CSMA/CD standard would differ significantly from their "Blue Book" de facto standard. They turned instead to the European Computer Manufacturers Association (ECMA), where Friedrich Röscheisen of Siemens helped to introduce the Blue Book as a candidate standard to a newly created "Local Networks" Task Group (TC24). Gary Robinson later claimed to have instigated the effort to convince ECMA to standardize CSMA/CD. ECMA approved a standard in June 1982 that was very close to the DIX de facto standard. Because the DIX proposal was the most technically complete and because of the speedy action taken by ECMA, the IEEE group felt compelled to approve the 802.3 CSMA/CD standard in December 1982. It differed only slightly from the DIX standard in terminology and frame format. IEEE published the 802.3 standard as a draft in 1983 and as a standard in 1985.

Approval of Ethernet on the international level was achieved by a similar, cross-partisan action with Ingrid Fromm, Siemens' representative to IEEE 802, as the liaison officer working to integrate with International Electrotechnical Commission (IEC) Technical Committee 83 and International Organization for Standardization (ISO) Technical Committee 97 Sub Committee 6. The ISO 8802-3 standard was published on March 23, 1989.

The IEEE has approved changes to its 802.3 (Ethernet) standard regularly since 1985. The current standard is available from the IEEE website. With each change to the standard, the IEEE first issues a supplement with a letter designation added to IEEE 802.3. For example, IEEE 802.3u refers to Fast Ethernet. Then when the supplement is formally approved, it is merged with the main standard.

Subsequent standards have provided for ever-faster versions of Ethernet, additional physical media, and network management. For a table of IEEE Ethernet standards, see IEEE 802.3 § Communication standards.

== Evolution ==
Ethernet has evolved to include higher bandwidth, improved medium access control methods, and different physical media. The multidrop coaxial cable was replaced with physical point-to-point links connected by Ethernet repeaters or switches.

Ethernet stations communicate by sending each other data packets: blocks of data individually sent and delivered. As with other IEEE 802 LANs, each adapter comes programmed with a globally unique 48-bit MAC address so that each Ethernet station has a unique address. (Note: In some cases, the factory-assigned address can be overridden, either to avoid an address change when an adapter is replaced or to use locally administered addresses.) The MAC addresses are used to specify both the destination and the source of each data packet. Ethernet establishes link-level connections, which can be defined using both the destination and source addresses. On reception of a transmission, the receiver uses the destination address to determine whether the transmission is relevant to the station or should be ignored. A network interface normally does not accept packets addressed to other Ethernet stations. (Note: Unless it is put into promiscuous mode.) (Note: Of course, bridges and switches will accept other addresses for forwarding the packet.)

An EtherType field in each frame is used by the operating system on the receiving station to select the appropriate protocol module (e.g., an Internet Protocol version such as IPv4). Ethernet frames are said to be self-identifying, because of the EtherType field. Self-identifying frames make it possible to intermix multiple protocols on the same physical network and allow a single computer to use multiple protocols together. Despite the evolution of Ethernet technology, all generations of Ethernet (excluding early experimental versions) use the same frame formats. Mixed-speed networks can be built using Ethernet switches and repeaters supporting the desired Ethernet variants.

Due to the ubiquity of Ethernet and the ever-decreasing cost of the hardware needed to support it, by 2004 most manufacturers built Ethernet interfaces directly into PC motherboards, eliminating the need for a separate network card.

=== Shared medium ===
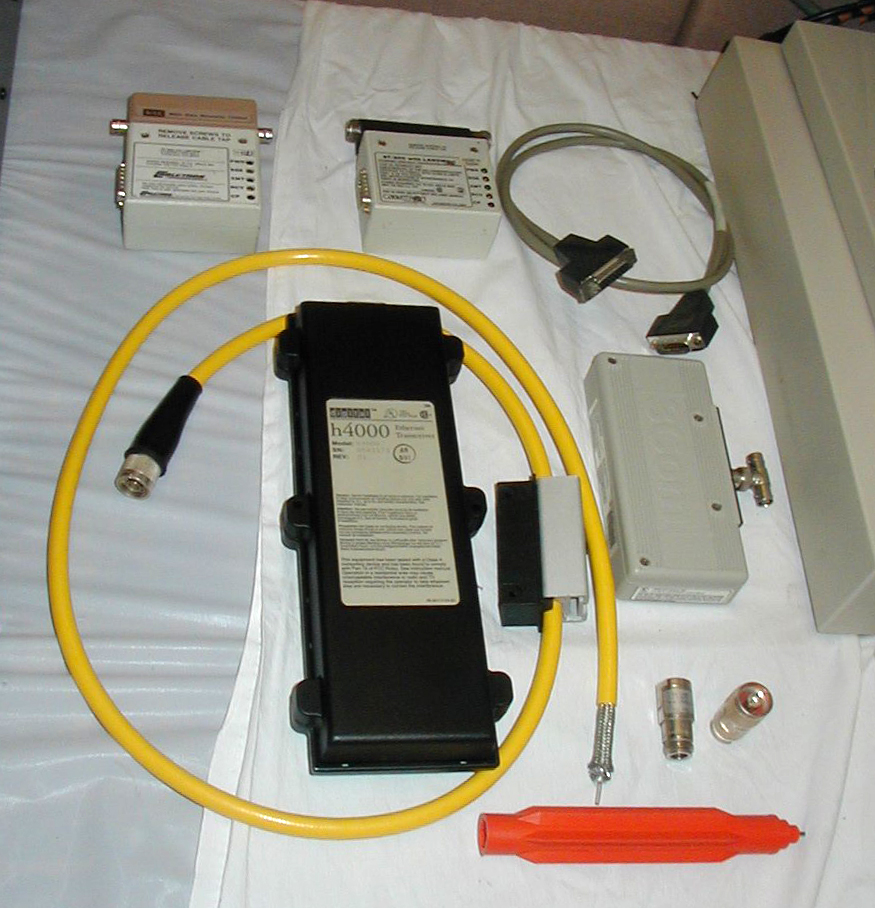
Older Ethernet equipment. Clockwise from top-left: An Ethernet transceiver with an in-line 10BASE2 adapter, a similar model transceiver with a 10BASE5 adapter, an AUI cable, a different style of transceiver with 10BASE2 BNC T-connector, two 10BASE5 end fittings (N connectors), an orange vampire tap installation tool (which includes a specialized drill bit at one end and a socket wrench at the other), and an early model 10BASE5 transceiver (h4000) manufactured by DEC. The short length of yellow 10BASE5 cable has one end fitted with an N connector and the other end prepared to have an N connector shell installed; the half-black, half-grey rectangular object through which the cable passes is an installed vampire tap.

Ethernet was originally based on the idea of computers communicating over a shared coaxial cable acting as a broadcast transmission medium. The method used was similar to those used in radio systems, (Note: There are fundamental differences between wireless and wired shared-medium communication, such as the fact that it is much easier to detect collisions in a wired system than a wireless system.) with the common cable providing the communication channel likened to the Luminiferous aether in 19th-century physics, and it was from this reference that the name Ethernet was derived.

The original Ethernet's shared coaxial cable (the shared medium) traversed a building or campus to connect every attached machine. A scheme known as carrier-sense multiple access with collision detection (CSMA/CD) governed the way the computers shared the channel. This scheme was simpler than competing Token Ring or Token Bus technologies. (Note: In a CSMA/CD system packets must be large enough to guarantee that the leading edge of the propagating wave of a message gets to all parts of the medium and back again before the transmitter stops transmitting, guaranteeing that collisions (two or more packets initiated within a window of time that forced them to overlap) are discovered. As a result, the minimum packet size and the physical medium's total length are closely linked.) Computers are connected to an Attachment Unit Interface (AUI) transceiver, which is in turn connected to the cable (with thin Ethernet, the transceiver is usually integrated into the network adapter). While a simple passive wire is highly reliable for small networks, it is not reliable for large extended networks, where damage to the wire in a single place, or a single bad connector, can make the whole Ethernet segment unusable. (Note: Multipoint systems are also prone to strange failure modes when an electrical discontinuity reflects the signal in such a manner that some nodes would work properly, while others work slowly because of excessive retries or not at all. See standing wave for an explanation. These could be much more difficult to diagnose than a complete failure of the segment.)

Through the first half of the 1980s, Ethernet's 10BASE5 implementation utilised a coaxial cable 0.375 inches (9.5 mm) in diameter, later referred to as thick Ethernet or thicknet. Its successor, 10BASE2, called thin Ethernet or thinnet, used the RG-58 coaxial cable. The emphasis was on making installation of the cable easier and less costly.

Since all communication happens on the same wire, any information sent by one computer is received by all, even if that information is intended for just one destination. (Note: This one speaks, all listen property is a security weakness of shared-medium Ethernet, since a node on an Ethernet network can eavesdrop on all traffic on the wire if it so chooses.) The network interface card interrupts the CPU only when applicable packets are received: the card ignores information not addressed to it. Use of a single cable also means that the data bandwidth is shared, such that, for example, available data bandwidth to each device is halved when two stations are simultaneously active.

A collision happens when two stations attempt to transmit at the same time. They corrupt transmitted data and require stations to re-transmit. The loss of data and retransmission reduce throughput. In the worst case, where multiple active hosts connected with maximum allowed cable length attempt to transmit many short frames, excessive collisions can reduce throughput dramatically. However, a Xerox report in 1980, published in Communications of the ACM, studied the performance of an existing Ethernet installation under both normal and artificially generated heavy load. The report claimed that 98% throughput on the LAN was observed. This is in contrast with token passing LANs (Token Ring, Token Bus), all of which suffer throughput degradation as each new node comes into the LAN, due to token waits. This report was controversial, as modeling showed that collision-based networks theoretically became unstable under loads as low as 37% of nominal capacity. Many early researchers failed to understand these results. Performance on real networks is significantly better.

In a modern Ethernet, the stations do not all share one channel through a shared cable or a simple repeater hub; instead, each station communicates with a switch, which in turn forwards that traffic to the destination station. In this topology, collisions are only possible if the station and switch attempt to communicate with each other at the same time, and collisions are limited to this link. Furthermore, the 10BASE-T standard introduced a full duplex mode of operation, which became familiar with Fast Ethernet and the de facto standard with Gigabit Ethernet. In full duplex, a switch and a station can send and receive simultaneously, and therefore modern Ethernet networks are completely collision-free.

Comparison between original Ethernet and modern Ethernet

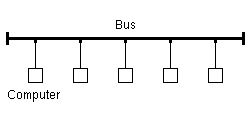
The original Ethernet implementation: shared medium, collision-prone. All computers trying to communicate share the same cable, and so compete with each other.

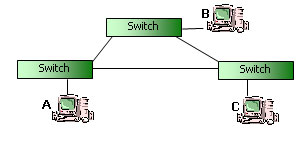
Modern Ethernet implementation: switched connection, collision-free. Each computer communicates only with its own switch, without competition for the cable with others.

=== Repeaters and hubs ===
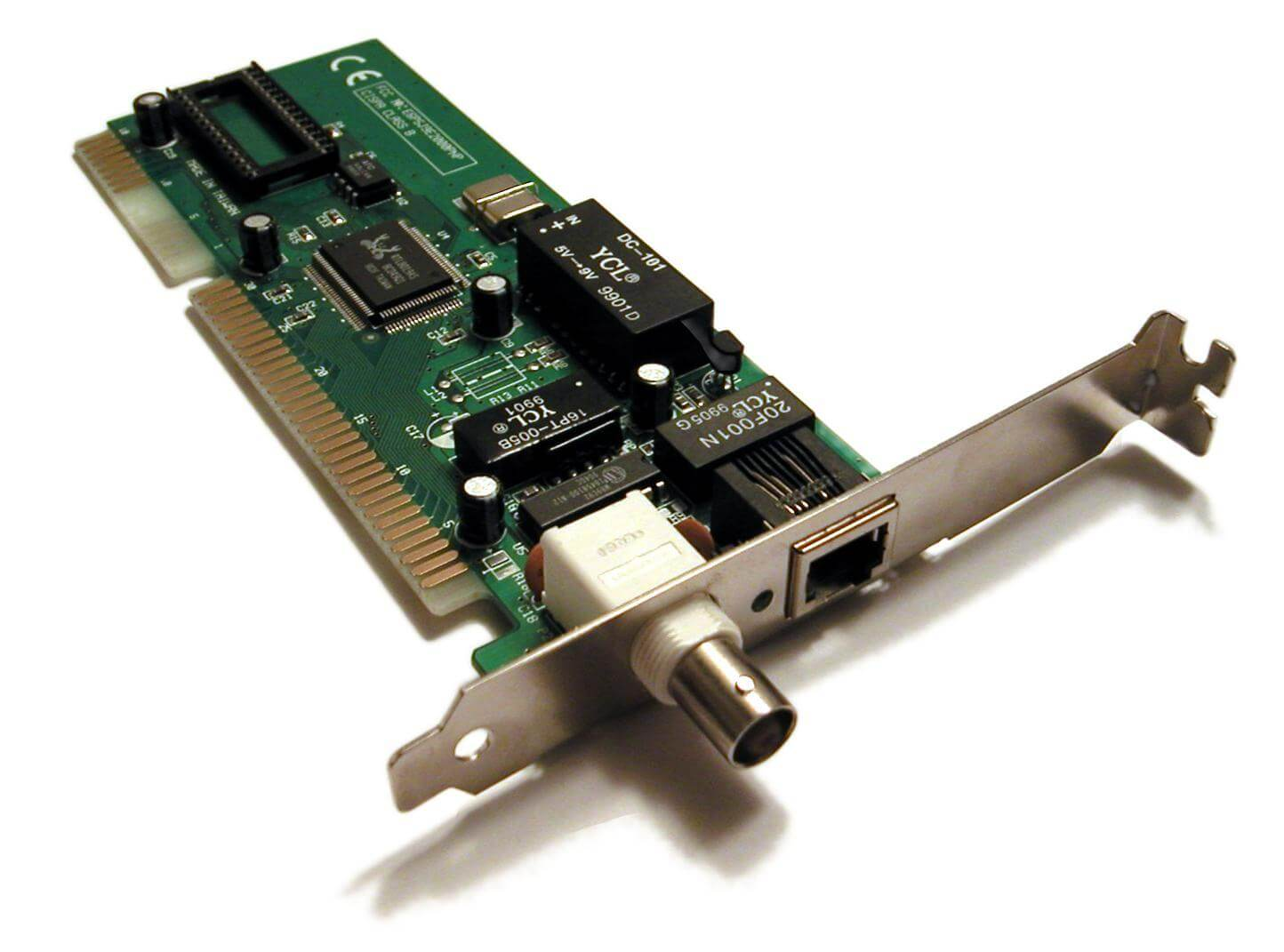
A 1990s ISA network interface card supporting both coaxial-cable-based 10BASE2 (BNC connector, left) and twisted-pair-based 10BASE-T (8P8C connector, right)

For signal degradation and timing reasons, coaxial Ethernet segments have a restricted size. Somewhat larger networks can be built by using an Ethernet repeater. Early repeaters had only two ports, allowing, at most, a doubling of network size. Once repeaters with more than two ports became available, it was possible to wire the network in a star topology. Early experiments with star topologies (called Fibernet) using optical fiber were published by 1978.

Shared cable Ethernet is always hard to install in offices because its bus topology is in conflict with the star topology cable plans designed into buildings for telephony. Modifying Ethernet to conform to twisted-pair telephone wiring already installed in commercial buildings provided another opportunity to lower costs, expand the installed base, and leverage building design, and, thus, twisted-pair Ethernet was the next logical development in the mid-1980s.

Ethernet on unshielded twisted-pair cables (UTP) began with StarLAN at 1 Mbit/s in the mid-1980s. In 1987 SynOptics introduced the first twisted-pair Ethernet at 10 Mbit/s in a star-wired cabling topology with a central hub, later called LattisNet. These evolved into 10BASE-T, which was designed for point-to-point links only, and all termination was built into the device. This changed repeaters from a specialist device used at the center of large networks to a device that every twisted pair-based network with more than two machines had to use. The tree structure that resulted from this made Ethernet networks easier to maintain by preventing most faults with one peer or its associated cable from affecting other devices on the network.

Despite the physical star topology and the presence of separate transmit and receive channels in the twisted pair and fiber media, repeater-based Ethernet networks still use half-duplex and CSMA/CD, with only minimal activity by the repeater, primarily the generation of the jam signal in dealing with packet collisions. Every packet is sent to every other port on the repeater, so bandwidth and security problems are not addressed. The total throughput of the repeater is limited to that of a single link, and all links must operate at the same speed.

=== Bridging and switching ===
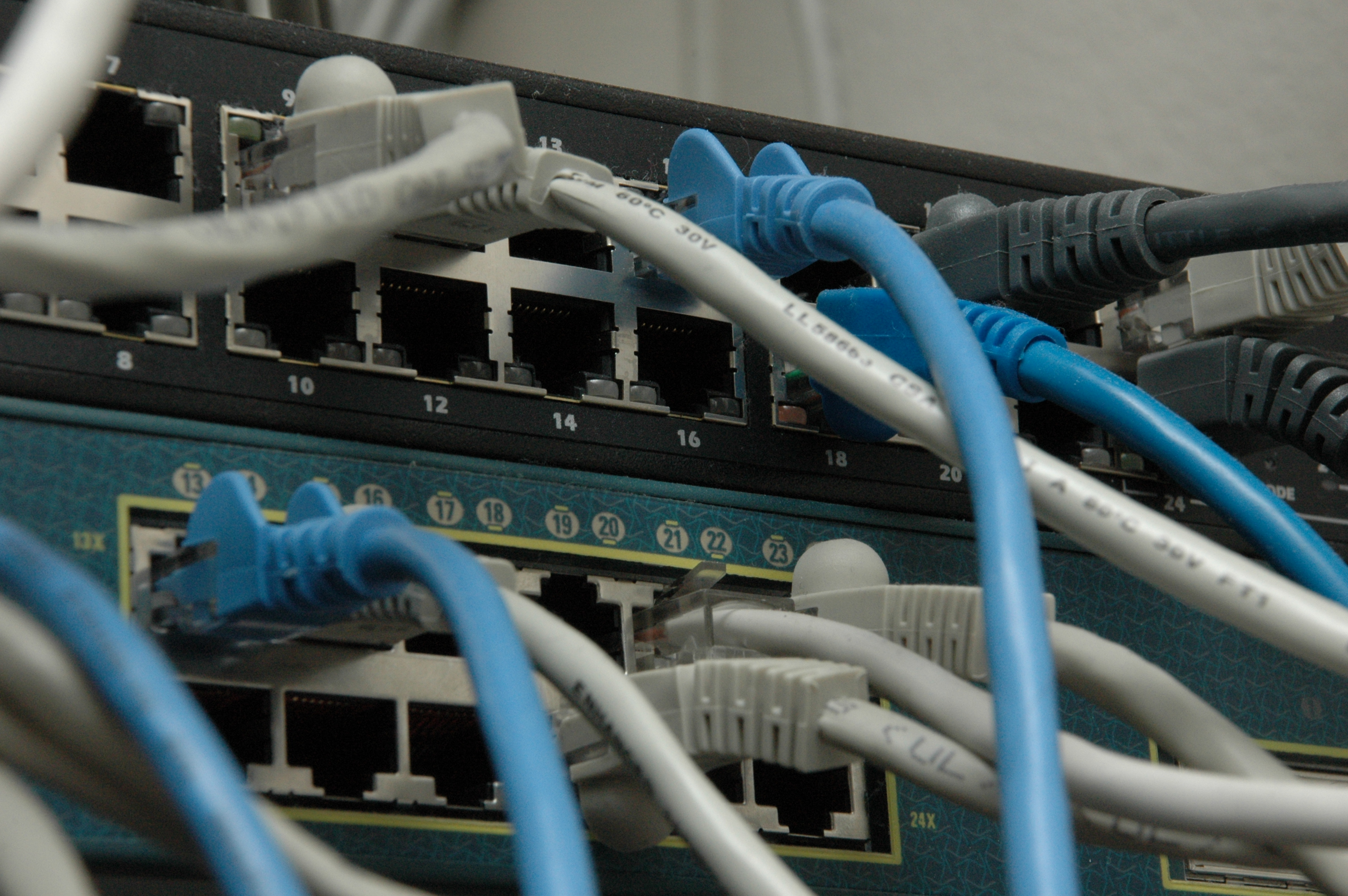
Patch cables with patch fields of two Ethernet switches

While repeaters can isolate some aspects of Ethernet segments, such as cable breakages, they still forward all traffic to all Ethernet devices. The entire network is one collision domain, and all hosts have to be able to detect collisions anywhere on the network. This limits the number of repeaters between the farthest nodes and creates practical limits on how many machines can communicate on an Ethernet network. Segments joined by repeaters have to all operate at the same speed, making phased-in upgrades impossible.

To alleviate these problems, bridging was created to communicate at the data link layer while isolating the physical layer. With bridging, only well-formed Ethernet packets are forwarded from one Ethernet segment to another; collisions and packet errors are isolated. At initial startup, Ethernet bridges work somewhat like Ethernet repeaters, passing all traffic between segments. By observing the source addresses of incoming frames, the bridge then builds an address table associating addresses to segments. Once an address is learned, the bridge forwards network traffic destined for that address only to the associated segment, improving overall performance. Broadcast traffic is still forwarded to all network segments. Bridges also overcome the limits on total segments between two hosts and allow the mixing of speeds, both of which are critical to the incremental deployment of faster Ethernet variants.

In 1989, Motorola Codex introduced their 6310 EtherSpan, and Kalpana introduced their EtherSwitch; these were examples of the first commercial Ethernet switches. (Note: The term switch was invented by device manufacturers and does not appear in the IEEE 802.3 standard.) Early switches such as this used cut-through switching where only the header of the incoming packet is examined before it is either dropped or forwarded to another segment. This reduces the forwarding latency. One drawback of this method is that it does not readily allow a mixture of different link speeds. Another is that packets that have been corrupted are still propagated through the network. The eventual remedy for this was a return to the original store and forward approach of bridging, where the packet is read into a buffer on the switch in its entirety, its frame check sequence verified and only then the packet is forwarded. In modern network equipment, this process is typically done using application-specific integrated circuits allowing packets to be forwarded at wire speed.

When a twisted pair or fiber link segment is used, and neither end is connected to a repeater, full-duplex Ethernet becomes possible over that segment. In full-duplex mode, both devices can transmit and receive to and from each other at the same time, and there is no collision domain. This doubles the aggregate bandwidth of the link and is sometimes advertised as double the link speed (for example, 200 Mbit/s for Fast Ethernet). (Note: This is misleading, as performance will double only if traffic patterns are symmetrical.) The elimination of the collision domain for these connections also means that all the link's bandwidth can be used by the two devices on that segment and that segment length is not limited by the constraints of collision detection.

Since packets are typically delivered only to the port they are intended for, traffic on a switched Ethernet is less public than on shared-medium Ethernet. Despite this, switched Ethernet should still be regarded as an insecure network technology, because it is easy to subvert switched Ethernet systems by means such as ARP spoofing and MAC flooding.

The bandwidth advantages, the improved isolation of devices from each other, the ability to easily mix different speeds of devices and the elimination of the chaining limits inherent in non-switched Ethernet have made switched Ethernet the dominant network technology.

=== Advanced networking ===
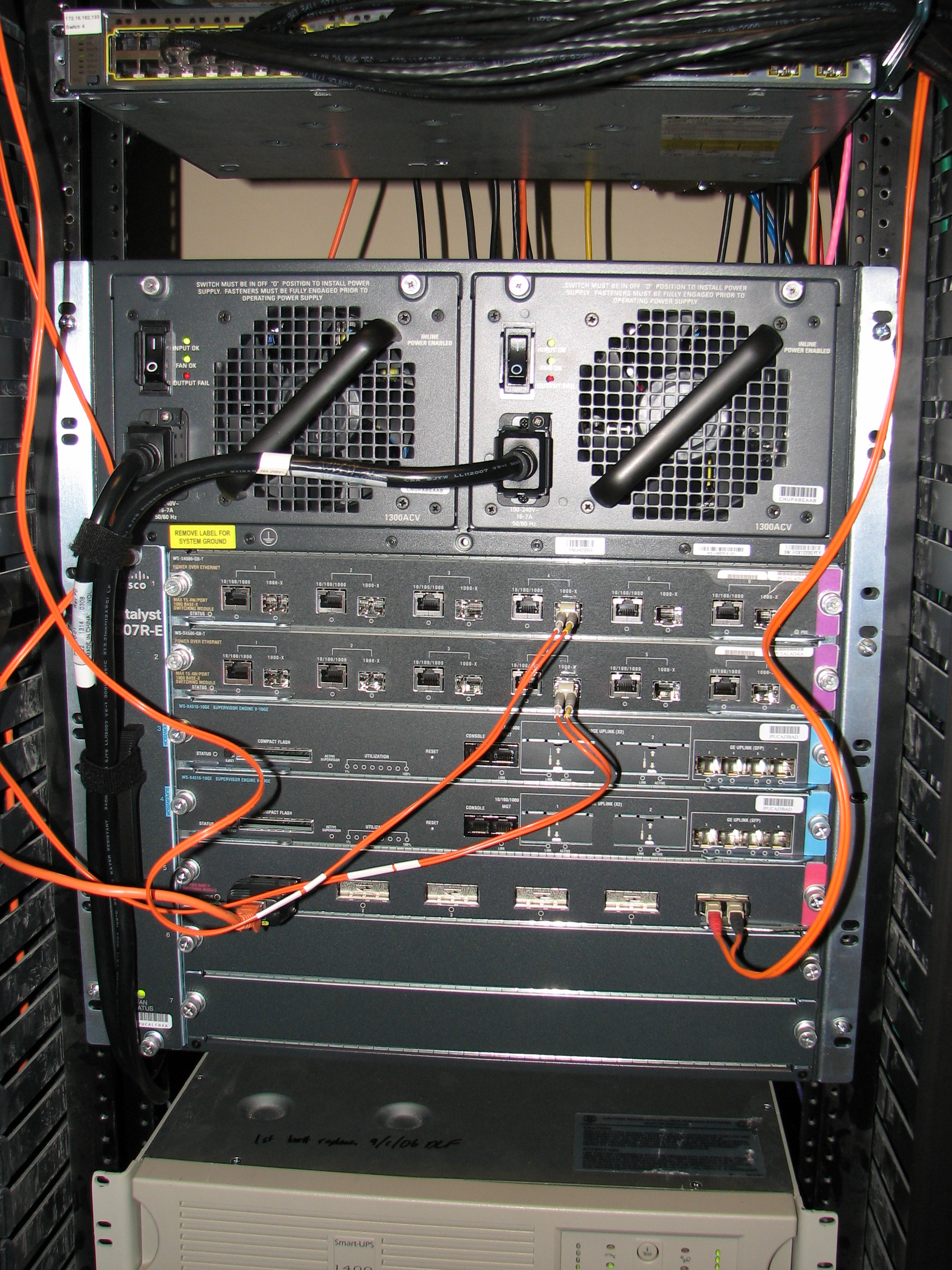
A core Ethernet switch

Simple switched Ethernet networks, while a great improvement over repeater-based Ethernet, suffer from single points of failure, attacks that trick switches or hosts into sending data to a machine even if it is not intended for it, scalability and security issues with regard to switching loops, broadcast radiation, and multicast traffic.

Advanced networking features in switches use Shortest Path Bridging (SPB) or the Spanning Tree Protocol (STP) to maintain a loop-free, meshed network, allowing physical loops for redundancy (STP) or load-balancing (SPB). Shortest Path Bridging includes the use of the link-state routing protocol IS-IS to allow larger networks with shortest path routes between devices.

Advanced networking features also ensure port security, provide protection features such as MAC lockdown and broadcast radiation filtering, use VLANs to keep different classes of users separate while using the same physical infrastructure, and use link aggregation to add bandwidth to overloaded links and to provide some redundancy.

In 2016, Ethernet replaced InfiniBand as the most popular system interconnect of TOP500 supercomputers.

In many industrial systems, Ethernet and fieldbus coexist, each performing certain roles, and data is exchanged between them through gateways.

== Varieties ==
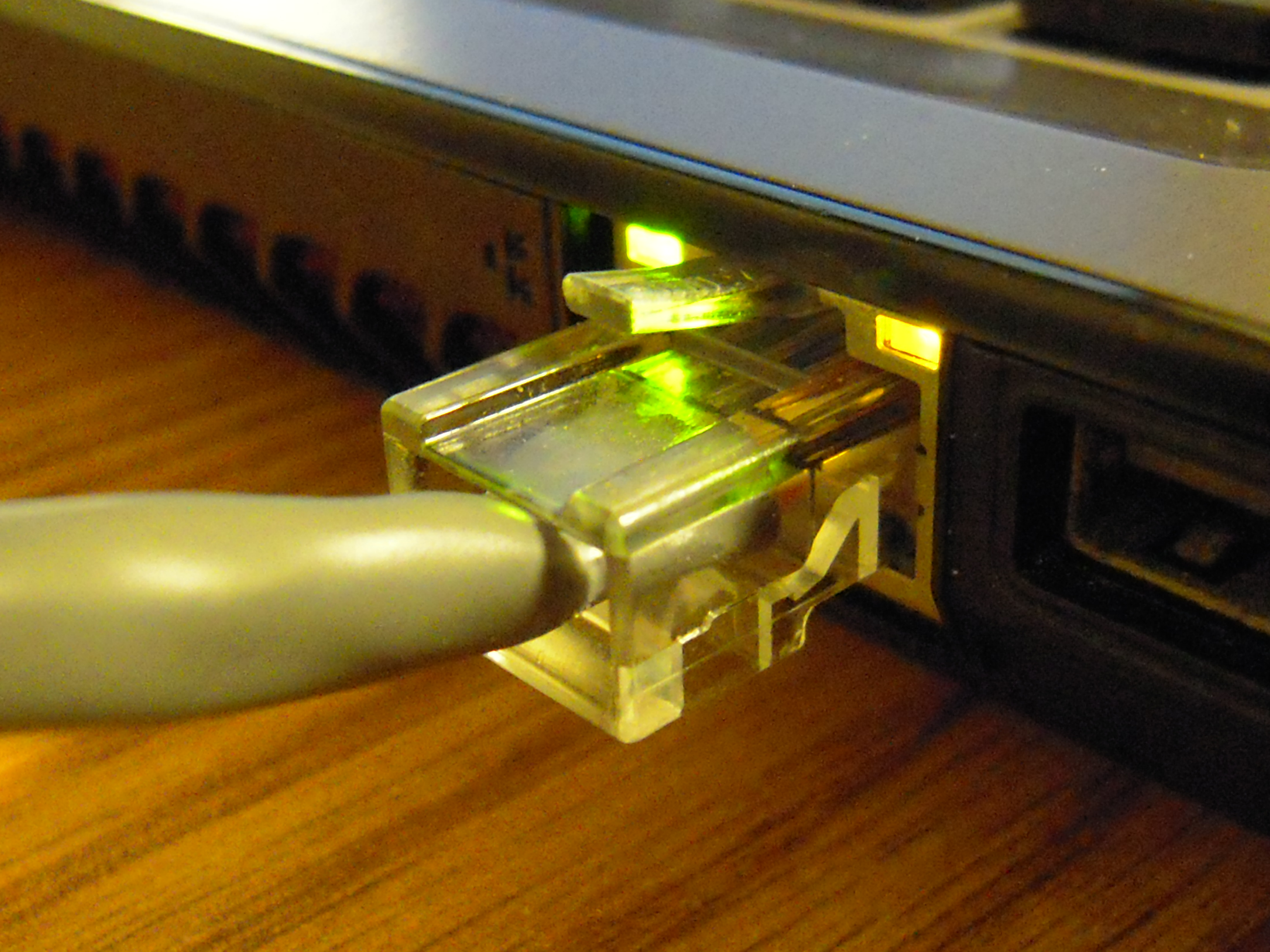
An Ethernet port on a laptop computer connected to a twisted pair cable with an 8P8C modular connector

The Ethernet physical layer evolved over a considerable time span and encompasses coaxial, twisted pair and fiber-optic physical media interfaces, with speeds from 1 Mbit/s to 400 Gbit/s. The first introduction of twisted-pair CSMA/CD was StarLAN, standardized as 802.3 1BASE5. While 1BASE5 had little market penetration, it defined the physical apparatus (wire, plug/jack, pin-out, and wiring plan) that would be carried over to 10BASE-T through 10GBASE-T.

The most common forms used are 10BASE-T, 100BASE-TX, and 1000BASE-T. All three use twisted-pair cables and 8P8C modular connectors. They run at 10 Mbit/s, 100 Mbit/s, and 1 Gbit/s, respectively.

Fiber optic variants of Ethernet (that commonly use SFP modules) are also very popular in larger networks, offering high performance, better electrical isolation and longer distance (tens of kilometers with some versions). In general, network protocol stack software will work similarly on all varieties.

== Frame structure ==
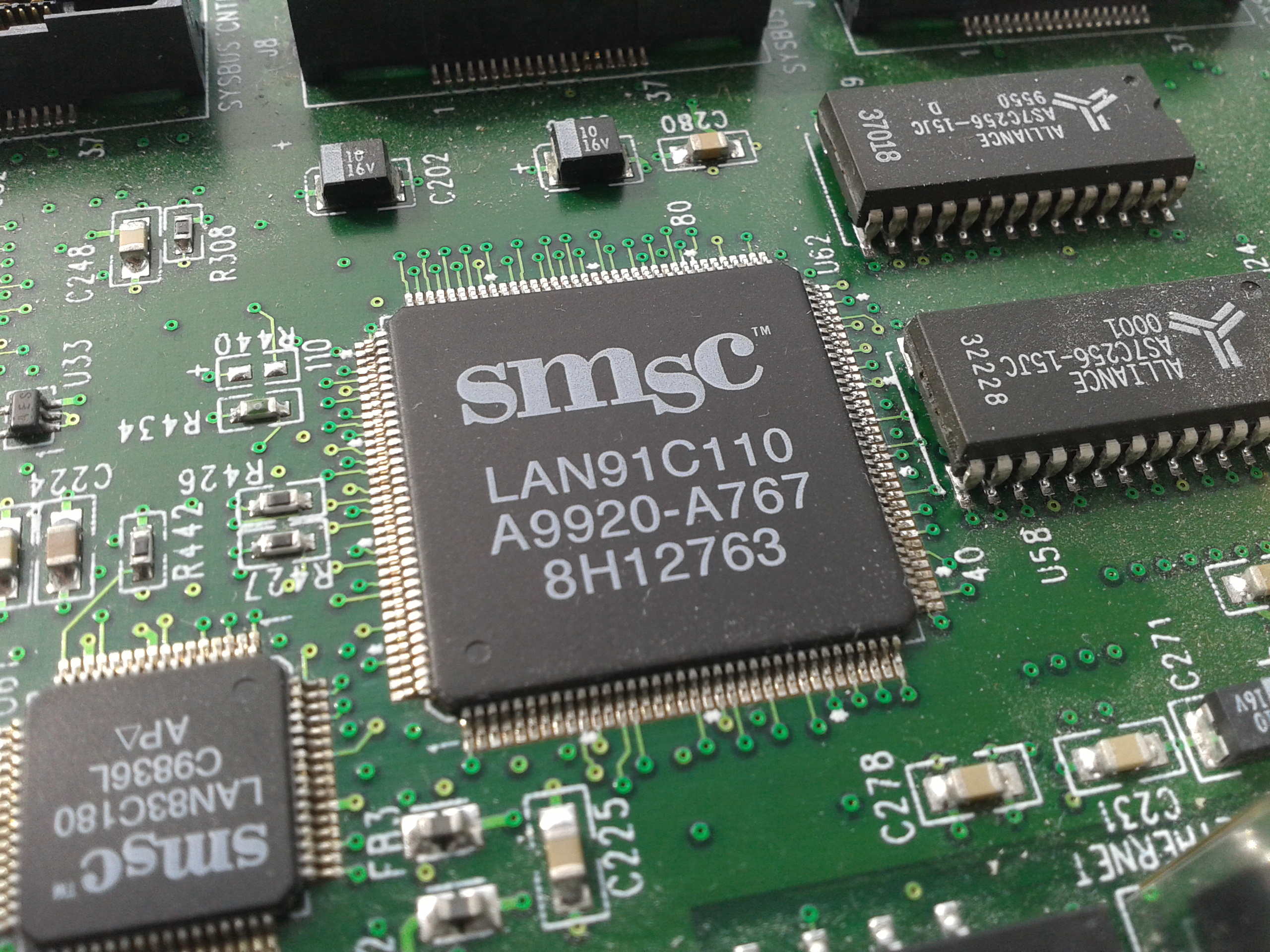
A close-up of the SMSC LAN91C110 (SMSC 91x) chip, an embedded Ethernet chip

In IEEE 802.3, a datagram is called a packet or frame. Packet is used to describe the overall transmission unit and includes the preamble, start frame delimiter (SFD) and carrier extension (if present). (Note: The carrier extension is defined to assist collision detection on shared-media gigabit Ethernet.) The frame begins after the start frame delimiter with a frame header featuring source and destination MAC addresses and the EtherType field giving either the protocol type for the payload protocol or the length of the payload. The middle section of the frame consists of payload data, including any headers for other protocols (for example, Internet Protocol) carried in the frame. The frame ends with a 32-bit cyclic redundancy check, which is used to detect corruption of data in transit. Notably, Ethernet packets have no time-to-live field, leading to possible problems in the presence of a switching loop.

== Autonegotiation ==
Autonegotiation is the procedure by which two connected devices choose common transmission parameters, e.g., speed and duplex mode. Autonegotiation was initially an optional feature, first introduced with 100BASE-TX (1995 IEEE 802.3u Fast Ethernet standard), and is backward compatible with 10BASE-T. The specification was improved in the 1998 release of IEEE 802.3. Autonegotiation is mandatory for 1000BASE-T and faster.

== Error conditions ==
=== Switching loop ===
A switching loop or bridge loop occurs in computer networks when there is more than one Layer 2 (OSI model) path between two endpoints (e.g., multiple connections between two network switches or two ports on the same switch connected to each other). The loop creates broadcast storms as broadcasts and multicasts are forwarded by switches out every port, the switch or switches will repeatedly rebroadcast the broadcast messages flooding the network. Since the Layer 2 header does not support a time to live (TTL) value, if a frame is sent into a looped topology, it can loop forever.

A physical topology that contains switching or bridge loops is attractive for redundancy reasons, yet a switched network must not have loops. The solution is to allow physical loops, but create a loop-free logical topology using the SPB protocol or the older STP on the network switches.

=== Jabber ===
A node that is sending longer than the maximum transmission window for an Ethernet packet is considered to be jabbering. Depending on the physical topology, jabber detection and remedy differ somewhat.

- An MAU is required to detect and stop abnormally long transmission from the DTE (longer than 20–150 ms) in order to prevent permanent network disruption.
- On an electrically shared medium (10BASE5, 10BASE2, 1BASE5), jabber can only be detected by each end node, stopping reception. No further remedy is possible.
- A repeater/repeater hub uses a jabber timer that ends retransmission to the other ports when it expires. The timer runs for 25,000 to 50,000 bit times for 1 Mbit/s, 40,000 to 75,000 bit times for 10 and 100 Mbit/s, and 80,000 to 150,000 bit times for 1 Gbit/s. Jabbering ports are partitioned off the network until a carrier is no longer detected.
- End nodes utilizing a MAC layer will usually detect an oversized Ethernet frame and cease receiving. A bridge/switch will not forward the frame.
- A non-uniform frame size configuration in the network using jumbo frames may be detected as jabber by end nodes. Jumbo frames are not part of the official IEEE 802.3 Ethernet standard.
- A packet detected as jabber by an upstream repeater and subsequently cut off has an invalid frame check sequence and is dropped.

=== Runt frames ===
- Runts are packets or frames smaller than the minimum allowed size. They are dropped and not propagated.

== See also ==
- 5-4-3 rule
- Chaosnet
- Ethernet Alliance
- Ethernet crossover cable
- Fiber media converter
- ISO/IEC 11801
- Link Layer Discovery Protocol
- List of interface bit rates
- LocalTalk
- PHY
- Physical coding sublayer
- Power over Ethernet
- Point-to-Point Protocol over Ethernet (PPPoE)
- Sneakernet
- Wake-on-LAN (WoL)
