= Carrier-sense multiple access with collision detection =

Media access control method used most notably in early Ethernet

Carrier-sense multiple access with collision detection (CSMA/CD) is a medium access control (MAC) method used most notably in early Ethernet technology for local area networking. It uses carrier-sensing to defer transmissions until no other stations are transmitting. This is used in combination with collision detection, in which a transmitting station detects collisions by sensing transmissions from other stations while it is transmitting a frame. When this collision condition is detected, the station stops transmitting that frame, transmits a jam signal, and then waits for a random time interval before trying to resend the frame.

CSMA/CD is a modification of pure carrier-sense multiple access (CSMA). CSMA/CD is used to improve CSMA performance by terminating transmission as soon as a collision is detected, thus shortening the time required before a retry can be attempted.

With the growing popularity of Ethernet switches in the 1990s, full duplex point-to-point operation became standard in FastEthernet and GigabitEthernet. Collisions don’t occur in such networks. Also, IEEE 802.3 deprecated Ethernet repeaters in 2011 in favor of Ethernet switches, making CSMA/CD and half-duplex operation less common and less important.

== Procedure ==
Simplified algorithm of CSMA/CD including retransmission logic used to resolve a detected collision

The following procedure is used to initiate a transmission. The procedure is complete when the frame is transmitted successfully or a collision is detected during transmission.

1. Is a frame ready for transmission? If not, wait for a frame.
2. Is the medium idle? If not, wait until it becomes ready. (Note: On Ethernet, stations must additionally wait the 96 bit interframe gap period.)
3. Start transmitting and monitor for collision during transmission.
4. Did a collision occur? If so, go to collision detected procedure.
5. Reset retransmission counters and complete frame transmission.

The following procedure is used to resolve a detected collision. The procedure is complete when retransmission is initiated or the retransmission is aborted due to numerous collisions.

1. Continue transmission (with a jam signal instead of frame header/data/CRC) until minimum packet time is reached to ensure that all receivers detect the collision.
2. Increment retransmission counter.
3. Was the maximum number of transmission attempts reached? If so, abort transmission.
4. Calculate and wait the random backoff period based on number of collisions.
5. Re-enter main procedure at stage 1.

Methods for collision detection are media dependent. On a shared, electrical bus such as 10BASE5 or 10BASE2, collisions can be detected by comparing transmitted data with received data or by recognizing a higher than normal signal amplitude on the bus. On all other media, a carrier sensed on the receive channel while transmitting triggers a collision event. Repeaters or hubs detect collisions on their own and propagate jam signals.

The collision recovery procedure can be likened to what happens at a dinner party, where all the guests talk to each other through a common medium (the air). Before speaking, each guest politely waits for the current speaker to finish. If two guests start speaking at the same time, both stop and wait for short, random periods of time (in Ethernet, this time is measured in microseconds). The hope is that by each choosing a random period of time, both guests will not choose the same time to try to speak again, thus avoiding another collision.

== Jam signal ==
The jam signal or jamming signal is a signal that carries a 32-bit binary pattern sent by a data station to inform the other transmitting stations of the collision and that they must not transmit.

The maximum jam-time is calculated as follows: The maximum allowed diameter of an Ethernet installation is limited to 232 bits. This makes a round-trip time of 464 bits. As the slot time in Ethernet is 512 bits, the difference between slot time and round-trip-time is 48 bits (6 bytes), which is the maximum jam-time.

This in turn means: A station noting a collision has occurred is sending a 4- to 6-byte-long pattern composed of 16 1-0 bit combinations. (Note: The size of this jam signal is clearly above the minimum allowed frame-size of 64 bytes.)

The purpose of this is to ensure that any other node that may currently be receiving a frame will receive the jam signal in place of the correct 32-bit MAC CRC; this causes the other receivers to discard the frame due to a CRC error.

== Late collision ==
A late collision is a type of collision that happens further into the packet than is allowed for by the protocol standard in question. In 10-megabit-per-second shared-medium Ethernet, if a collision error occurs after the first 512 bits of data are transmitted by the transmitting station, a late collision is said to have occurred. Importantly, late collisions are not re-sent by the NIC, unlike collisions occurring before the first 64 octets; it is left for the upper layers of the protocol stack to determine that there was loss of data.

As a correctly set up CSMA/CD network link should not have late collisions, the usual possible causes are full-duplex/half-duplex mismatch, exceeded Ethernet cable length limits, or defective hardware such as incorrect cabling, non-compliant number of hubs in the network, or a bad NIC.

== Local collision ==
A local collision is a collision that occurs at the NIC, as opposed to on the wire. A NIC cannot detect local collisions without attempting to send information.

On UTP cable, a local collision is detected on the local segment only when a station detects a signal on the RX pair at the same time it is sending on the TX pair. Since the two signals are on different pairs, there is no characteristic change in the signal. Collisions are only recognized on UTP when the station is operating in half-duplex. The only functional difference between half and full-duplex operation in this regard is whether or not the transmit and receive pairs are permitted to be used simultaneously.

== Remote collision ==
A remote collision, in CSMA/CD computer networks over half-duplex media (10BASE5 or 10BASE2), is a collision that occurs when a frame shorter than the minimum length is transmitted. This frame may cause a collision at the remote end, which cannot be detected by the transmitter, so the frame is not resent on the physical layer. Due to interference on the medium, its data is corrupted and frame check sequence fails, requiring recovery at a higher layer, if possible.

== Channel capture effect ==
The channel capture effect is a phenomenon where one user of a shared medium "captures" the medium for a significant time. During this period (usually 16 frames), other users are denied use of the medium. This effect was first seen in networks using CSMA/CD on Ethernet. Because of this effect, the most data-intense connection dominates the multiple-access wireless channel. This happens in Ethernet links because of the way nodes "back off" from the link and attempt to re-access it. In the Ethernet protocol, when a communication collision happens (when two users of the medium try to send at the same time), each user waits for a random period of time before re-accessing the link. However, a user will wait ("back off") for a random amount of time proportional to the number of times it has successively tried to access the link. The channel capture effect happens when one user continues to "win" the link.

For example, user A and user B both try to access a quiet link at the same time. Since they detect a collision, user A waits for a random time between 0 and 1 time units and so does user B. Let's say user A chooses a lower back-off time. User A then begins to use the link and B allows it to finish sending its frame. If user A still has more to send, then user A and user B will cause another data collision. A will once again choose a random back-off time between 0 and 1, but user B will choose a back-off time between 0 and 3 – because this is B's second time colliding in a row. Chances are A will "win" this one again. If this continues, A will most likely win all the collision battles, and after 16 collisions (the number of tries before a user backs down for an extended period of time), user A will have "captured" the channel.

The ability of one node to capture the entire medium is decreased as the number of nodes increases. This is because, as the number of nodes increases, there is a higher probability that one of the "other" nodes will have a lower back-off time than the capturing node.

The channel capture effect creates a situation where one station is able to transmit while others are continually backing off, thus leading to a situation of short-term unfairness. Yet, the situation is long-term fair because every station has the opportunity to "capture" the medium once one station is done transmitting. The efficiency of the channel is increased when one node captures the channel.

A negative side effect of the capture effect would be the idle time created due to stations backing off. Once one station is finished transmitting on the medium, large idle times are present because all other stations were continually backing off. In some instances, back-off can occur for so long that some stations actually discard packets because maximum attempt limits have been reached.

== Applications ==
CSMA/CD was used in now-obsolete shared-medium Ethernet variants (10BASE5, 10BASE2), and in the early versions of twisted-pair Ethernet, which used repeater hubs. Modern Ethernet networks, built with switches and full-duplex connections, no longer need to use CSMA/CD, because each Ethernet segment, or collision domain, is now isolated. CSMA/CD is still supported for backwards compatibility and for half-duplex connections. The IEEE 802.3 standard, which defines all Ethernet variants, for historical reasons still bore the title "Carrier sense multiple access with collision detection (CSMA/CD) access method and physical layer specifications" until 802.3-2008, which uses new name "IEEE Standard for Ethernet".

== See also ==
- Carrier-sense multiple access with collision avoidance (CSMA/CA)
- Token passing, a more deterministic channel access method
