= Collision (telecommunications) =

A collision is the situation that occurs when two or more demands are made simultaneously on equipment that can handle only one at any given instant. It may refer to:

- Collision domain, a physical network segment where data packets can "collide"
  - Carrier-sense multiple access with collision avoidance, (CSMA/CA) used for example with wireless LANs
  - Carrier-sense multiple access with collision detection, (CSMA/CD) used with Ethernet
- Late collision, a specific type of collision that should not occur on properly operating networks
- Local collision is a collision that occurs in the network interface rather than on the network itself

== See also ==
- Collision (disambiguation)
- Contention (telecommunications)
