= Shared medium =

Medium connecting more than one user or more than two communications hosts

In telecommunication, a shared medium is a medium or channel of information transfer that serves more than one user at the same time.

In order for most channels to function correctly, no more than one user can be transmitting at a time, so a channel access method must always be in effect.

In circuit switching, each user typically gets a fixed share of the channel capacity. A multiplexing scheme divides up the capacity of the medium. Common multiplexing schemes include time-division multiplexing and frequency-division multiplexing. Channel access methods for circuit switching include time-division multiple access, frequency-division multiple access, etc.

In packet switching, the sharing is more dynamic — each user takes up little or none of the capacity when idle, and can utilize the entire capacity if transmitting while all other users are idle. Channel access methods for packet switching include carrier-sense multiple access, token passing, etc.

== Examples ==
- DOCSIS
- GPON
- 10BASE5
