= Wilocity =

Fabless semiconductor company

- Type: Subsidiary
- Founded: 2007
- Headquarters: Caesarea, Israel
- Parent: Qualcomm/Qualcomm Atheros
- Website: www.wilocity.com

Wilocity was a fabless semiconductor company based in California founded in 2007 developing 60 GHz multi-gigabit wireless chipsets for both the mobile computing platform and peripheral markets. Wilocity was founded in March 2007 by executives and engineers from Intel's Wi-Fi Centrino group. While Wilocity is based in California, most of its employees are in Israel. Based on the WiGig specification, Wilocity's Wireless PCI Express (wPCIe) technology enables multi-gigabit wireless for applications including I/O, networking and video.

The company is involved in 60 GHz multi-gigabit wireless industry organizations. Wilocity was a founding member of the Wireless Gigabit Alliance (WiGig) and serves on its board of directors and chairs the Marketing Work Group. Wilocity initiated the creation of the IEEE 802.11 ad Task Group, which enhances the 802.11n wireless LAN standard to multi-gigabit-per-second speeds in the 60 GHz band. In addition, Wilocity led the creation of the Wi-Fi Alliance 60 GHz Gigabit Wireless Marketing Task Group and serves as its chair.

On July 14, 2010 Wilocity and Atheros, a developer of semiconductors for network communications, announced a technology partnership to build a "tri-band wireless solution." Tri-band devices will leverage the 2.4, 5 and 60 GHz bands, delivering multi-gigabit data transfer speeds while maintaining compatibility with legacy Wi-Fi products.

On May 12, 2014, ZDNet reported that Qualcomm was on the brink of acquiring Wilocity. According to financial website TheMarker, Qualcomm's potential acquisition could cost the company up to $400 million.

On 3 July 2014 the successful purchase was announced, Wilocity now being part of Qualcomm Atheros. The triple-band-WLAN-chip Snapdragon 810 was also announced.

== See also ==
- Wireless Gigabit Alliance
- Wi-Fi Alliance
- IEEE 802.11
