= Gifi =

Gifi may refer to:

- GiFi, French chain of discount stores
- Gi-Fi, a generic term for wireless communication at a bit rate of at least one gigabit per second
