= 1E 0317+186 =

BL Lacertae object located in the constellation Aries

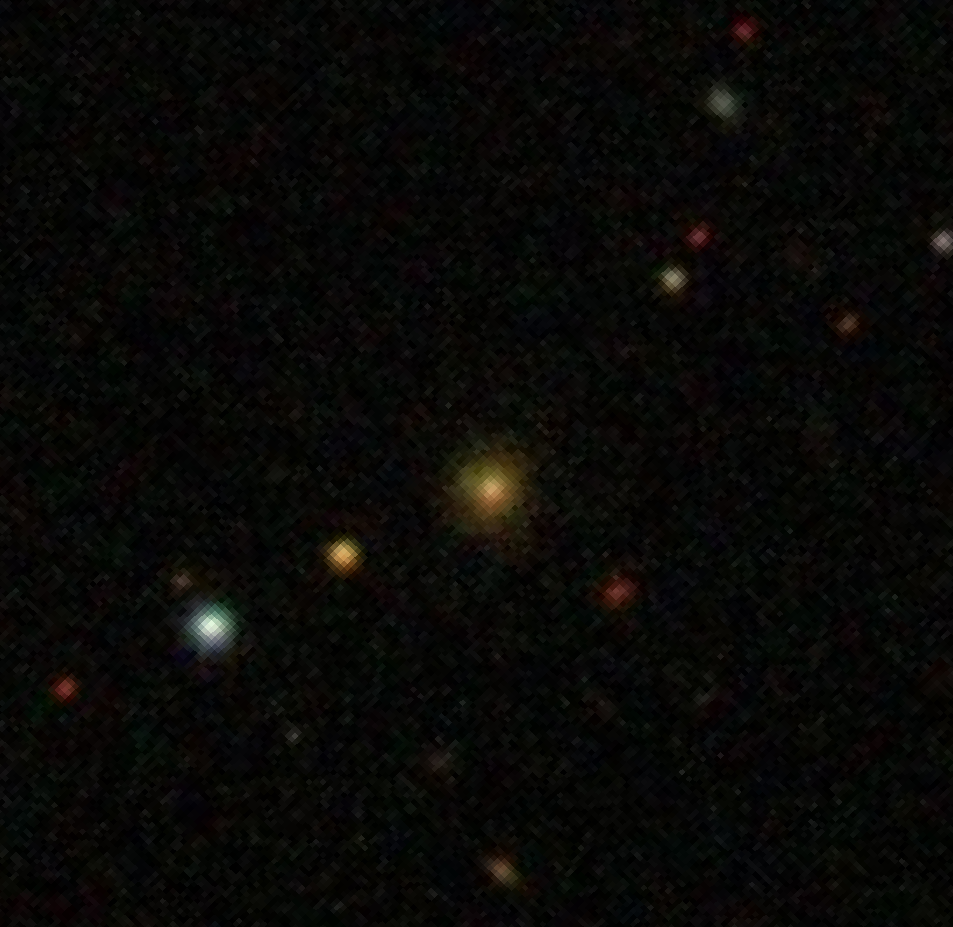
- The BL Lac object 1E 0317+186.

Observation data (J2000.0 epoch)
- Constellation: Aries
- Right ascension: 03^{h} 19^{m} 51.81^{s}
- Declination: +18° 45′ 34.58″
- Redshift: 0.190000
- Heliocentric radial velocity: 56,961 km/s
- Distance: 2.399 Gly
- Apparent magnitude (V): 18.12

Characteristics
- Type: Opt.var. BLLAC
- Size: ~282,200 ly (86.53 kpc) (estimated)

Other designations
- 2MASX J03195178+1845338, 4FGL J0319.8+1845, LEDA 138616, RBS 0413, MS 0317.0+1834, 1E 0317.0+1835

1E 0317+186, also known as RBS 413, is a BL Lacertae object or a blazar located in the constellation of Aries. The redshift of the object is (z) 0.190 and it was first discovered as an astronomical X-ray source during the Einstein survey in August 1983 by astronomers.

== Description ==
1E 0317+186 is classified as an X-ray selected BL Lacertae object. The host galaxy has been categorized as an elliptical galaxy with a magnitude of -23.0 based on a study published in 1999 by Renato Falomo, dismissing the fact that this object is hosted by a spiral or a disk galaxy. A companion galaxy is located between 1 and 2 arcseconds away from the host. The supermassive black hole of 1E 0317+186 is estimated to be 7.57 M_{☉}.

Studies have indicated 1E 0317+186 is variable. It displays a decrease in brightness levels in the V-band, decreasing by 0.77 magnitude within 1.7 hours. It has also been noted to show one rapid outburst which was followed by a faded state from 17.57 to 18.20 in V-band frequencies. In the R-band, it has shown another outburst within the time range of 2.2 hours in December 1988. In February 1997, it showed an increase in brightness levels of 0.51 magnitude. Gamma-ray emission has also been detected in 2009, with the average flux levels of 2.4 ± 1.0 × 10^{−9} photons cm^{−2} s^{−1}.

Radio imaging made by the Very Long Baseline Array (VLBA) has shown the object has a jet component that is moving with proper motion speeds of 0.493 ± 0.100 milliarcseconds per year. The radio structure of the BL Lacertae object is mainly made up of a radio core and a few components.
