= IEEE 802.11ay =

IEEE standard in bandwidth

IEEE 802.11ay, Enhanced Throughput for Operation in License-exempt Bands above 45 GHz, is a follow-up to IEEE 802.11ad WiGig standard which quadruples the bandwidth and adds MIMO up to 8 streams. Development started in 2015 and the final standard IEEE 802.11ay-2021 was approved in March 2021.

== Technical details ==
802.11ay is a type of WLAN in the IEEE 802.11 family of Wi-Fi WLANs. It is an improvement on IEEE 802.11ad rather than a new standard. It uses the 60 GHz band and has a transmission rate of 20–40 Gbit/s and an extended transmission distance of 300–500 meters. It includes mechanisms for channel bonding and MU-MIMO technologies. It was originally expected to be released in 2017, but was delayed until 2021.

Where 802.11ad uses a maximum of 2.16 GHz bandwidth, 802.11ay bonds four of those channels together for a maximum bandwidth of 8.64 GHz. MIMO is also added with a maximum of four streams. The link-rate per stream is 44 Gbit/s, with four streams this goes up to 176 Gbit/s. Higher order modulation is also added, probably up to 256-QAM.

Applications could include replacement for Ethernet and other cables within offices or homes, and provide backhaul connectivity outside for service providers.

802.11ay should not be confused with the similarly named 802.11ax that was officially approved in 2021. The 802.11ay standard is designed to run at much higher frequencies. The lower frequency of 802.11ax enables it to penetrate walls somewhat, while 802.11ay is generally blocked by walls.

60 GHz WiGig channels
Channel 2.16 GHz	Frequency (GHz)			Channel 4.32 GHz		Channel 6.48 GHz			Channel 8.64 GHz				Channel 1.08 GHz	Frequency (GHz)		
Channel 2.16 GHz	Center	Min.	Max.	Channel 4.32 GHz		Channel 6.48 GHz			Channel 8.64 GHz				Channel 1.08 GHz	Center	Min.	Max.
1	58.32	57.24	59.40	9	—N/a	17	—N/a	—N/a	25	—N/a	—N/a	—N/a	33	57.78	57.24	58.32
2	60.48	59.40	61.56	9	10	17	18	—N/a	25	26	—N/a	—N/a	34	58.86	58.32	59.40
3	62.64	61.56	63.72	11	10	17	18	19	25	26	27	—N/a	35	59.94	59.40	60.48
4	64.80	63.72	65.88	11	12	20	18	19	25	26	27	28	36	61.02	60.48	61.56
5	66.96	65.88	68.04	13	12	20	21	19	29	26	27	28	37	62.10	61.56	62.64
6	69.12	68.04	70.20	13	14	20	21	22	29	—N/a	27	28	38	63.18	62.64	63.72
7	71.28	70.20	72.36	15	14	—N/a	21	22	29	—N/a	—N/a	28	39	64.26	63.72	64.80
8	73.44	72.36	74.52	15	—N/a	—N/a	—N/a	22	29	—N/a	—N/a	—N/a	40	65.34	64.80	65.88

== Draft versions ==
Draft version 0.1 of 802.11ay was released in January 2017, followed by draft version 0.2 in March 2017. Draft version 1.0 was made available in November 2017, and draft 1.2 was available as of April 2018.

Draft version 7.0 was released in December 2020 and the Final 802 Working Group Approval was received in February 2021.

== See also ==
- List of WLAN channels
- IEEE
