= Gi-Fi =

Gigabit-speed wireless communication

Gi-Fi or gigabit wireless refers to wireless communication at a bit rate of at least one gigabit per second (Gbit/s).

By 2004 some trade press used the term "Gi-Fi" to refer to faster versions of the IEEE 802.11 standards marketed under the trademark Wi-Fi.

In 2008 researchers at the University of Melbourne demonstrated a transceiver on a single integrated circuit (chip) operating at 60 GHz on the CMOS process, allowing wireless communication speeds of up to 5 Gbit/s within a 10-metre (33-foot) range. Some press reports called this "GiFi". It was developed by the Melbourne University-based laboratories of NICTA (National ICT Australia Limited).

In 2009, the Wireless Gigabit Alliance was formed to promote the technology. It used the term "WiGig" which avoided trademark confusion.
