= RBS 1467 =

BL Lacertae object in the constellation Boötes

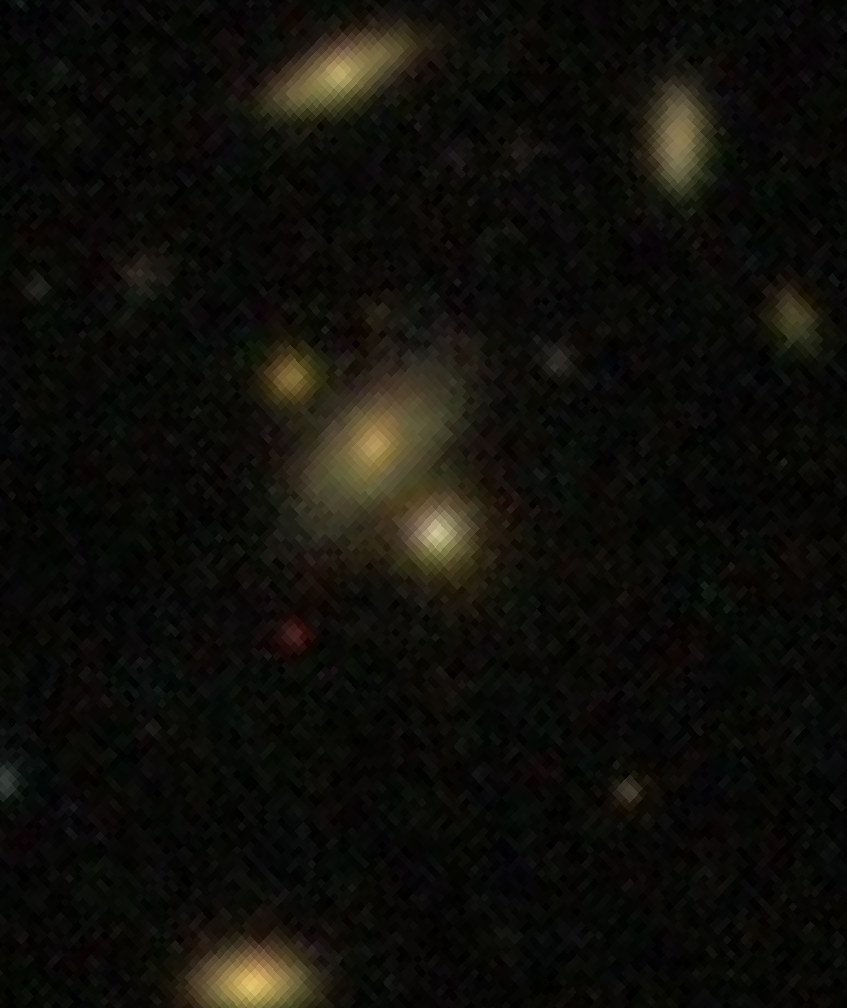
- SDSS image of RBS 1467

Observation data (J2000.0 epoch)
- Constellation: Boötes
- Right ascension: 15^{h} 08^{m} 42.62^{s}
- Declination: +27° 09′ 07.46″
- Redshift: 0.269595
- Heliocentric radial velocity: 80,823 ± 27 km/s
- Distance: 3,895.1 ± 272.7 Mly (1,194.25 ± 83.60 Mpc)
- Absolute magnitude (V): 14.49

Characteristics
- Type: BLLAC
- Size: ~853,000 ly (261.4 kpc) (estimated)

Other designations
- 2MASX J15084264+2709081, RHS 46, RX J1508.7+2709, LEDA 1799317, 4FGL J1508.8+2708, [MGL2009] BZB J1508+2709, 2WHSP J150842.5+270908, SDSS J150842.61+270907.7, 1RXS J150842.2+270910, LEDA 3516976

RBS 1467 also known as J1508.6+2709, is a BL Lacertae object located in the constellation of Boötes. The redshift of the object is (z) 0.269 and it was first discovered from the ROSAT Bright Survey as a point-like source by astronomers in October 1998 where it is designated as 1RXS J150842.2+270910.

== Description ==
RBS 1467 is BL Lac object with a B-band apparent magnitude of 18.8 magnitude with its total radio flux density estimated to be 39.9 mJy at 1.4 GHz frequencies. The V-band magnitude is estimated to be 18.50 magnitude while the flux density calculated by ROSAT band is 3.92 erg cm^{−2} s^{−1}.

It is also categorized as a high-energy-peaked BL Lac object (HBL) based on its synchrotron peaked frequency of 17.3. A study published in 2012, has found it is a blazar detected by Fermi Gamma-ray Space Telescope with its gamma-ray photon flux measured to be 4.1 ± 1.1 × 10^{−10} photons cm^{−2} s^{−1} and has a gamma-ray photon spectral index of 1.97 ± 0.27 Γ_{γ}. The total X-ray flux density at 1 keV is found to be 1.01E-0.6 mJy.

Evidence found RBS 1467 is a radio-loud gamma-ray active galaxy. It has a presence of a radio jet, with the jet power being estimated to be 45.2 erg s^{−1}. The radius of the radio emission contained within a spherical region is found to be 16.8 centimeters while the magnetic field strength is -1.68 Gs. A study published in 2022, has detected a parsec-scale jet with the jet position angle of -131° and has a median distance of 2.9 milliarcseconds between its jet components and its radio core. A central supermassive black hole is found and estimated as 8.30 M_{☉}. The accretion disk luminosity is 43.95 erg/s.
