= San Francisco Digital Inclusion Strategy =

The San Francisco Digital Inclusion Strategy (SFDIS) is a policy initiative in San Francisco, CA. It is part of TechConnect, which is an initiative aimed at achieving Mayor Gavin Newsom's campaign promise to provide all San Franciscans with free wireless internet access.

TechConnect did not originally have a digital inclusion component. After significant criticism from groups that had advanced the idea of citywide wireless, the City's Department of Telecommunications and Information Services (DTIS) created a Digital Inclusion Task Force. This Task Force created what is now apparently known as the San Francisco Digital Inclusion Strategy hopes to ease the Digital Divide in the city of San Francisco. The digital divide is the gap between those with regular, effective access to digital technologies and those without.

On the city's website Newsom said, “We are committed to bring universal, affordable wireless broadband internet access to all San Francisco’s residents and businesses.”

The initiative will focus on underserved neighborhoods and disadvantaged residents within San Francisco. By applying national statistics to the city's demographics, they estimate that 200,000 San Francisco residents lack access to informational technology. Today, the Internet and other digital technologies, are very important for employment, information/education, and social networking. Those without access to such technologies are at a distinct disadvantage.

There are six major aspects of the plan. The most widely publicized is the San Francisco Municipal Wireless initiative that was the cornerstone, and originally the only component of TechConnect.

== Strategic elements ==
According to the San Francisco Digital Inclusion Strategy Executive Summary, the six major program goals are Free and Affordable Wireless Internet Access, Computer Ownership and Basic Training Programs, Online Safety and Responsibility, Accessible Solutions, Enhanced Digital Literacy Programs, and Relevant, Multi-language Internet Content and Online Services.

=== Free and Affordable Wireless Internet Access ===
The goal is to have wireless access throughout the City- in schools, homes, and businesses and on the street. Because technology hasn't advanced too far past the wireless routers we all use in our apartments, the wireless network will consist of maybe a thousand points of connectivity to blanket the city.

In addition to a range of low cost, high bandwidth services, the San Francisco program will offer a free basic service designed to read e-mail and surf the Internet.

The free connection will allow web access at 300 kbit/s while high-speed access (1 Mbit/s) will be available for $21.95. 3200 high-speed accounts will be available for qualifying low-income residents for $12.95.

=== Computer Ownership and Basic Training Programs ===
This program will attempt to expand personal computer ownership to all residents of San Francisco and teach users basic skills like email and web browsing to use their new tools. The city plans to increase awareness about current programs that collect, refurbish and distribute used computers to underserved communities. In addition, a low or no-interest computer purchase program will relieve qualifying low-income residents of some of the financial stress of purchasing a new computer. Furthermore, technology fairs in the underserved neighborhoods will promote these services.

=== Online Safety and Responsibility ===
With the goal that all San Franciscans should feel comfortable using the Internet in ways that are appropriate to their and their families’ needs, educational programs will be implemented to increase parents’ awareness of resources that help protect children's online safety.

=== Accessible Solutions ===
The goal behind this provision is that all San Franciscans, including those with disabilities, will have unhindered access to the Internet. People with physical and mental disabilities and some seniors may need special accommodations to more easily use a computer and the Internet. The city will promote current Accessibility and Ease of Use tools in current software. In addition, promotion of new technologies to help users with a number of disabilities will also be important.

The implementation of computer purchase programs will include at least one configuration for physical impairments.

=== Enhanced Digital Literacy Programs ===
Computer training will be available for residents to move from novice to expert users. Basic technical support (over phone and on-site) and computer training will be available to underserved communities in SF.

=== Relevant, Multi-language Internet Content and Online Services ===
In order to better serve San Francisco's diverse and multicultural communities, the city hopes to increase multi-lingual and multi-cultural content geared towards underserved communities. A ‘digital inclusion’ portal will provide info about the purchasing programs and services described before. It will at least be in English, Spanish and Chinese. Community based websites and local content and news will be encouraged and promoted through Google and Earthlink. Finally, training programs will be available for communities to develop their own content.

== Objections to the SFDIS ==
While most will agree that the goal of easing the digital divide is a good one, many informed people have raised objections to franchise contract with EarthLink/Google.

=== Lack of ownership ===
Under the current model, the city and its residents will not own the infrastructure that makes free wi-fi possible. It will belong to EarthLink, who will then sell wholesale network capacity to Google.

=== Coverage uncertainty ===
There are no assurances the wireless network coverage will be complete. There are concerns the signal will not reach interior rooms, or above the second floor. Individuals in these situations will need to purchase a repeater box which can cost as much as $150. Even then, the box would need to be placed in a location that can get a signal in the first place.

=== Length of Contract ===
The city of San Francisco's contract with Earthlink consist of 4 four-year terms which are automatically renewed. This could leave San Francisco at the mercy of EarthLink in terms of network maintenance and upgrades.

=== Connection speed ===
The free service would be 300 kbit/s, 1/3 the speed of what other cities are getting in their wifi deals.

== Possible Alternatives ==
One possible alternative to such an institutionalized wireless system, is the product line from Meraki The mini, a low-cost and lower power type of repeater box, assists in creating a free wi-fi network by allowing users to broadcast their unused bandwidth and coordinate this with bandwidth broadcast by other Minis in its area. While it may not be a feasible citywide plan, and raises some serious terms of service questions with ISPs, it shows some creativity and demonstrates an alternative to the massive plan set to move forward in San Francisco.

Existing is SFLAN, a project of the Internet Archive, for over five years is San Francisco's first and only prolific community Wi-Fi network. It boasts network neutrality and ample bandwidth without any additional or special hardware other than one's current wireless devices. Its difference is its solid, stable connection when wireless equipment is mounted on the roof of a building plus the ability to maintain a wired inside environment.
