= IEEE 802.11mc =

Task Group mc (TGmc) of the IEEE 802.11 Working Group, sometimes referred to as IEEE 802.11mc, was the third maintenance/revision group for the IEEE 802.11 WLAN standards. Its purpose was to incorporate accumulated maintenance changes (editorial and technical corrections) into IEEE Std 802.11-2012, and roll up approved amendments into the standard.

The work by TGmc resulted in the publication of IEEE Std 802.11-2016 in 2016.

TGmc has ceased its operation. Maintenance/revision for IEEE Std 802.11-2016 is being handled by TGmd.

== Amendments rolled-In ==
Following amendments were incorporated by TGmc on top of IEEE Std 802.11-2012:

- IEEE Std 802.11ae-2012
- IEEE Std 802.11aa-2012
- IEEE Std 802.11ad-2012
- IEEE Std 802.11ac-2013
- IEEE Std 802.11af-2013

== Wi-Fi Round Trip Time ==
While it is not the main purpose of the maintenance/revision group, some features deemed not big enough to require a full Task Group within the IEEE 802.11 WG are sometimes added to the IEEE 802.11 standard via the maintenance/revision group.

The main feature added through TGmc is commonly known as Wi-Fi Round Trip Time (Wi-Fi RTT). It allows computing devices to measure the distance to nearby Wi-Fi access points (APs) and determine their indoor location with a precision of 1–2 metres using round-trip delay. The accuracy is better than estimations with trilateration based on received signal strength indication (RSSI).

=== Concept ===
With a single Wi-Fi access point, only a distance measurement is available. With three or more nearby APs, an app can trilaterate a device's location with an accuracy of one to two meters.

The technology operation principle is based on time delay in signal reception and transmission - the time necessary for sending a signal and the time required for receiving its confirmation have to be taken into account. The system calculates this time span and then multiplies it by the speed of light.

Not all devices have the necessary hardware support yet for this feature. Google maintains a list of certified routers, including certain Google Nest, Cisco, and Aruba models.

=== Application ===
With accurate indoor position awareness, apps can perform advanced automation based on where a device is in a building. For example, a smartphone user can have lights turn on when they enter a particular room by simply making voice commands since the device is location-aware (e.g. "turn on the lights in this room").

The technology makes it possible to create location-based applications and detailed services that let users orient easily inside buildings. In comparison with BLE, the function ensures higher accuracy in defining location and accelerates production processes.

Navigine tested the performance of the Wi-Fi RTT technology and made the conclusion that, subject to the specified requirements, the obtained result exceeds the declared values. Thus, within 95% of the time, the positioning accuracy in the check point is less than 1 m and within 50% of the time, the accuracy figures are kept within the limits of 30 cm. The delay in locating doesn't exceed 1 sec. Such time frames can be achieved by using the function of calculating pedestrian coordinates (PDR) within the particle filter.

=== Android Pie ===
Wi-Fi Round-Trip-Time in Android Pie does not require that the phone connect to any Wi-Fi access points. Only the phone is used to determine distance, not the APs. This feature is also tied into the Android operating system's existing location system to preserve the user's privacy. Apps using round-trip delay time (RTT) need the location permission, and the device must have location-based services enabled at the system level.

Many smartphone models with the Android 9 or later operating system can calculate the distance to access points. The following devices support Wi-Fi RTT technology: Xiaomi, LG Corporation, Samsung, Google Pixel, Poco X2, Sharp Aquos.
