= Wireless Gigabit Alliance =

Trade association

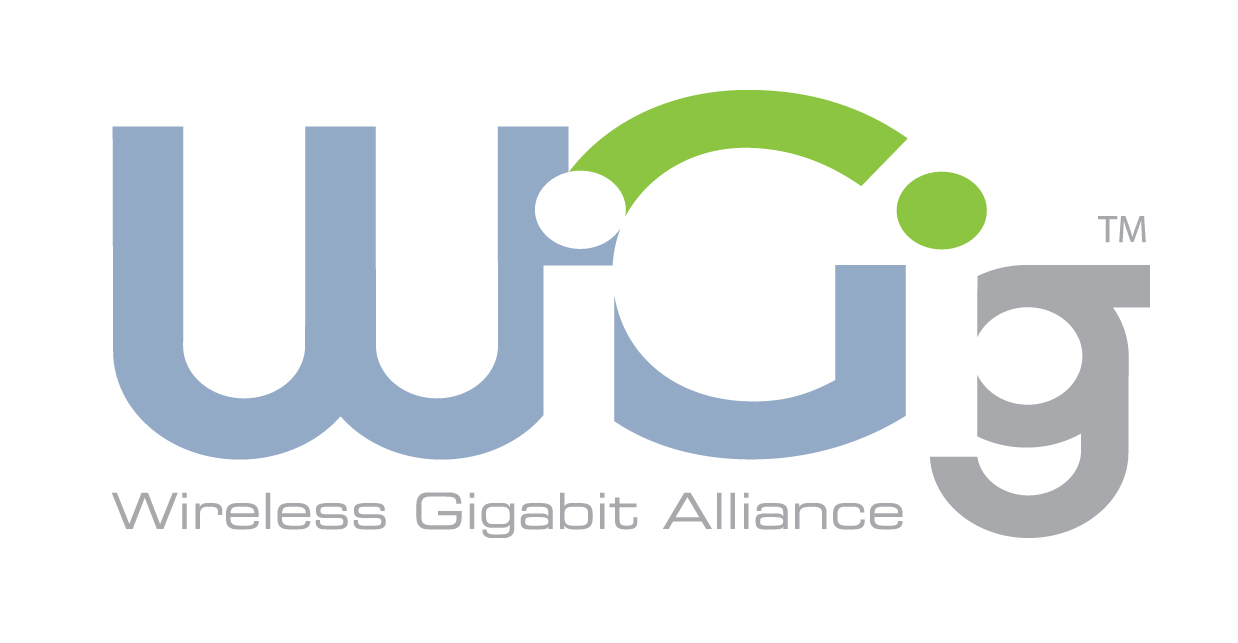
WiGig Alliance logo

The Wireless Gigabit Alliance (WiGig Alliance) was a trade association that developed and promoted the adoption of multi-gigabit per second speed wireless communications technology "WiGig" operating over the unlicensed 60 GHz frequency band. The alliance was subsumed by the Wi-Fi Alliance in March 2013.

The formation of the WiGig alliance to promote the IEEE 802.11ad protocol was announced in May 2009. The completed version 1.0 WiGig specification was announced in December 2009. In May 2010, WiGig announced the publication of its specification, the opening of its Adopter Program, and the liaison agreement with the Wi-Fi Alliance to cooperate on the expansion of Wi-Fi technologies. In June 2011, WiGig announced the release of its certification-ready version 1.1 specification.

== Members ==
Among the companies that comprise the board of directors are:

- AMD
- Apple Inc.
- Broadcom Corporation
- Cisco Systems, Inc.
- Dell Inc.
- Huawei Technologies
- Intel Corporation
- Marvell International LTD.
- MediaTek Inc.
- Microsoft
- NEC Corporation
- Nokia Corporation
- NVIDIA Corporation
- Panasonic Corporation
- Qualcomm Atheros
- Sony Corporation
- Samsung Electronics Co.
- Toshiba Corporation
- Wilocity

Contributor members include:

- Aeroflex
- Agilent Technologies
- Allegro DVT
- Beam Networks
- CSR
- Future Technology Devices International
- Harman International
- Hittite
- Institute for Infocomm Research
- Keysight Technologies
- MET Labs
- Nitero
- NXP
- Peraso Technologies, Inc.
- Rohde & Schwarz
- Samsung Electro-Mechanics
- Sivers IMA
- SK Telecom
- SRTC
- STMicroelectronics
- Tensorcom, Inc.
- Texas Instruments
- TMC
- UL CCS
- ZTE Corporation

Ali Sadri is the president and chairman of the board of WiGig Alliance, and also founded the movement. Sadri directs all activities throughout the alliance, from leading the board of directors to providing support for the technical working groups.

== History ==
The Wireless gigabit alliance set about its task for creating faster and more efficient communications technology in 2007. Their idea was to set about creating wirelessly interconnected home entertainment and office devices, like PCs, tablets, smartphones and displays, entirely removing the need for wires. They also wanted devices to be constantly connected and ready to transfer. Thus eliminating the need to have both a laptop and a tablet, as a device could connect straight to a display. In May 2009, the alliance announced something, and WiGig 1.0, announced in December of the same year. In 2010, WiGig and the Wi-Fi alliance announced a cooperation agreement. The agreement combined 60 GHz with traditional Wi-Fi networking that extended the range at slower speeds and helped signals to go through walls to cover entire homes. On November 3, 2010, the WiGig Alliance and the Video Electronics Standards Association (VESA) announced an association to define the next generation standard wireless display technology. VESA and WiGig Alliance agreed to share technology specifications to develop multi-gigabit wireless Display Port capabilities.

The official standard was published by the Standards Association of the IEEE in December 2012 as IEEE 802.11ad-2012 as an amendment to the overall IEEE 802.11 standard family.

In January 2013, after more than two years of collaboration, the Wireless Gigabit Alliance announced it would merge with the Wi-Fi Alliance. The merger was finalized in March. Although no longer a separate organization, the WiGig technology kept its name, with the Wi-Fi Alliance planning to jointly certify both devices in late 2013.

On September 9, 2013, a statement revealed that the WiGig protocol would be used in a new wireless version of USB through a deal between the Wi-Fi Alliance and the USB Implementers Forum. The Wireless USB standard would use existing USB 2.0 and 3.0 drivers. The Wi-Fi alliance transferred WiGig wireless transmission technology to the USB Implementers Forum as it is expected that WiGig certified products will implement USB functionality.

== Applications ==
On November 3, 2010, WiGig Alliance announced the WiGig version 1.0 A/V and I/O protocol adaptation layer (PAL) specifications. The application specifications have been developed to support specific system interfaces including extensions for PC peripherals and display interfaces for HDTVs, monitors and projectors.

WiGig Display Extension

- Supports wireless transmission of audio/visual data
- Enables wireless DisplayPort and other display interfaces that include the High-bandwidth Digital Content Protection 2.0 feature.
- Offers key A/V applications, such as the transmission of lightly compressed or uncompressed video from a computer or digital camera to an HDTV, monitor or projector

WiGig Bus Extension and WiGig Serial Extension. The WiGig Bus Extension (WBE) was available to members in 2011.

- Define high-performance wireless implementations of widely used computer interfaces over 60 GHz
- Enable multi-gigabit wireless connectivity between any two devices, such as connection to storage and other high-speed peripherals

== License ==
On May 10, 2010, the Wi-Fi Alliance and WiGig Alliance announced a cooperation agreement for multi-gigabit wireless networking. The Wi-Fi Alliance and the WiGig Alliance shared technology specifications for the development of a Wi-Fi Alliance certification program supporting Wi-Fi operation in the 60 GHz frequency band.

On November 3, 2010, the WiGig Alliance and the Video Electronics Standards Association (VESA) announced a liaison for standard wireless display technology. VESA and WiGig Alliance agreed to share technology specifications to develop multi-gigabit wireless DisplayPort capabilities and create a certification program for wireless DisplayPort products.

On June 28, 2011, the WiGig Alliance announced becoming an Adopter of HDMI Licensing, LLC to further provide WiGig Display Extension (WDE) support for HDMI mapping. WDE is the only 60 GHz specification that defines a framework to connect to DisplayPort monitors and HDMI TVs, enabling applications such as the wireless transmission of compressed or uncompressed video.

== Competition ==
WiGig competes with WirelessHD in some applications. WirelessHD transmits in the same 60 GHz band used by WiGig.

== See also ==
- Wi-Fi Alliance
