= IEEE 802.11ad =

Wireless networking standard in the 802.11 family for WiGig (60 GHz) networks

IEEE 802.11ad (also referred to by its subject directional multi-gigabit, i.e., DMG) is an amendment to the IEEE 802.11 wireless networking standard, developed to provide a Multiple Gigabit Wireless System (MGWS) standard in the 60 GHz band, and is a networking standard for WiGig networks. Because it uses the V band of the millimeter wave (mmW) band, the range of IEEE 802.11ad communication would be rather limited (just a few meters and difficult to pass through obstacles/walls) compared to other conventional Wi-Fi systems. However, its great bandwidth enables the transmission of data at high data rates up to multiple gigabits per second, enabling usage scenarios like transmission of uncompressed UHD video over the wireless network.

The WiGig standard was announced in 2009 and added to the IEEE 802.11 family in December 2012.

After revision, the 60 GHz band is 57 to 71 GHz. The band is subdivided into 6 (previously 4) different channels in IEEE 802.11ad, each of them occupy 2160 MHz of space and provide 1760 MHz of bandwidth.

Channel	Center (GHz)	Min. (GHz)	Max. (GHz)	BW (GHz)
1	58.32	57.24	59.40	2.16
2	60.48	59.40	61.56	2.16
3	62.64	61.56	63.72	2.16
4	64.80	63.72	65.88	2.16
5	66.96	65.88	68.04	2.16
6	69.12	68.04	70.20	2.16

Some of these frequencies might not be available for the use of IEEE 802.11ad networks around the world (reserved for other purposes or requires licenses). Below is a list of available unlicensed spectrums for IEEE 802.11ad in different parts of the world:

Region	lower frequency	upper frequency	usable channels	Note
USA	57.05 GHz	71.00 GHz	1, 2, 3, 4, 5, 6	Extended to include 64-71GHz in year 2016
Canada	57.05 GHz	64.00 GHz	1, 2, 3	Expected to open up 64-71GHz in late 2021
South Korea	57.00 GHz	64.00 GHz	1, 2, 3	
EU	57.00 GHz	66.00 GHz	1, 2, 3, 4	Future opening up of 66-71GHz recommended
Russia	57.00 GHz	66.00 GHz	1, 2, 3, 4	
Japan	57.00 GHz	66.00 GHz	1, 2, 3, 4	57-59 GHz added in year 2011
Australia	57.00 GHz	66.00 GHz	1, 2, 3, 4	Allowed spectrum expanded in year 2018.
China	59.00 GHz	64.00 GHz	2, 3	See also IEEE 802.11aj
Singapore	57.00 GHz	66.00 GHz	1, 2, 3, 4	Allowed spectrum as of September 2019.
Pakistan	57.00 GHz	66.00 GHz	1, 2, 3, 4	Allowed spectrum as of June 2022.

== See also ==
- Wireless Gigabit Alliance
- IEEE 802.11ay
