= San Francisco Municipal Wireless =

San Francisco Municipal Wireless was a canceled municipal wireless network that would have provided internet access to the city of San Francisco, California.

The network was originally proposed by San Francisco mayor Gavin Newsom in 2004. In late 2005, the city put out a formal request for proposals, and in April 2006 it was announced that a joint proposal by Earthlink and Google had won the bid. The San Francisco Budget Analyst completed a report that analyzes possibilities for a municipal system and critiques the proposed Google/Earthlink option. The proposal was formally scrapped by the city on 12 September 2007, citing a loss of confidence in Earthlink's financial situation.

== Proposal ==
The purpose of the proposal was to provide free, wireless Internet access throughout San Francisco that anyone with a computer and wireless access device could log into. Wireless access points would be mounted on light poles throughout the city to provide coverage.

San Francisco had little money to build out their own infrastructure and so they looked for a commercial provider to build it out. A comment and proposal process was constructed with an RFI/C, or "Request for Information and Comment" and a RFP, or a "Request for Proposal". In 2005 the RFI gave the public a forum for input on how the program could work and be constructed. In 2005 through 2006 the RFP was designed to pick a provider for the project. The RFI/C and RFP processes came about as the City of San Francisco was already talking to Earthlink and Google about the project and there was concern by the public and the Board of Supervisors that the project was on a fast-track without enough public input on the project. With the end of the RFP, the Google/Earthlink partnership was in the lead to be awarded the contract.

There were two primary components to the Earthlink/Google proposal: Earthlink would install and maintain the network and provide a higher speed (1 Mbit/s), paid connection. Google would be an anchor tenant on Earthlink's network, offering a free basic service (300 kbit/s). Earthlink's plan would have offered a two-tiered pricing scheme, with a discount for qualifying low-income residents.

=== Criticisms of proposal ===
The San Francisco Budget Analyst's Office has criticized the proposal, claiming that the Department of Technology and Information Services (DTIS) engaged in a biased and secretive process while crafting the proposal. DTIS's critics state that the network would provide low bandwidth, wireless-only connectivity, and that it would fail to serve its stated purpose of providing internet access to underserved communities. Studies commissioned by other San Francisco agencies show that a municipally owned, rather than privately owned option, could provide users with far superior service, at little or no cost to the end user.

Some complaints were based on the fact that alternative networks were not considered during RFP phase.

=== Death of the proposal ===
Many of the Board of Supervisors saw the proposal as the mayor's project that did not include or give a chance for input by the supervisors. These supervisors tried to slow down the process in order for public input to be made. With this effort by the supervisors and with the mayor knowing that the supervisors would be needed for final approval, the mayor's office put a non-binding proposal on the November 6, 2007 Municipal Election known as Prop J - "Universal Wi-Fi Declaration of Policy". In it, the Mayor wanted to show the Board of Supervisors that public opinion supported the project in order to push the process along. Just before the election, Earthlink killed the negotiations with the City when they could not justify the financial business model. Prop J did go on to pass in the election, but with Earthlink out of the picture, the project, as drafted in the RFI/C process, was dead.

Soon after Earthlink dropped out, the mayor's office and San Francisco Department of Technology re-looked at how they could go forward with the resources at hand. During the RFI/C and RFP process, city-owned fiber was suggested by at least one participant in the process as a way to provide backbone broadband infrastructure for the City. The City has started an effort to provide Internet access to various city housing developments via city-owned fiber. At this point, more than 40 housing developments are connected via this fiber or via wireless links coming from fiber connected sites. At many of these developments, the City has also provided free wireless access via Cisco, Ubiquiti Networks and Meraki access points. Residents of the developments as well as neighbors to the developments can get free Internet access via these access points.

== Wireless community networks ==
Later advances in technology made setting up wireless community networks easier and more affordable. In 2008 a startup partially funded by Google called Meraki began providing a new generation of hardware called the Meraki Mini. Technically, Meraki was not a WISP in that the Internet connectivity was provided by individual cooperative members sharing their bandwidth rather than a central service. To jump-start the effort, Meraki initially gave away the units for free. It became the dominant wireless community network in San Francisco, at its height transmitting terabytes of data per day. However, Meraki stopped expanding its network in 2009, and in 2012 was acquired by Cisco.

=== SFlan ===
SFLan, a project of the Internet Archive, constructed an experimental cooperative wireless internet service provider (WISP) that grew to approximately 50 nodes, using an over-the-air backbone relying on line-of-sight transmission. Noise level in the ISM bands due to proliferating and competing Wi-Fi signals made many of their long-distance links (several miles) nonfunctional. The network contracted from 50 functioning nodes in February 2007 down to four by October. They are considering changing their architecture to a fiber-and-wireless hybrid by working with the City of San Francisco and leveraging their fiber network.

In 2010 MonkeyBrains, a local ISP, started a pilot wireless project in the Mission District of San Francisco. During the pilot phase, they are providing residential users free service with a nominal setup fee. The City being whipsawed by corporate powers, SFLan ending their experiment, and Meraki's "Free the Net" placed on hold all provided MonkeyBrains with the motivation to start their 2010 free wifi in the Mission.
