= WiGig =

Type of wireless local area network based on IEEE 802.11

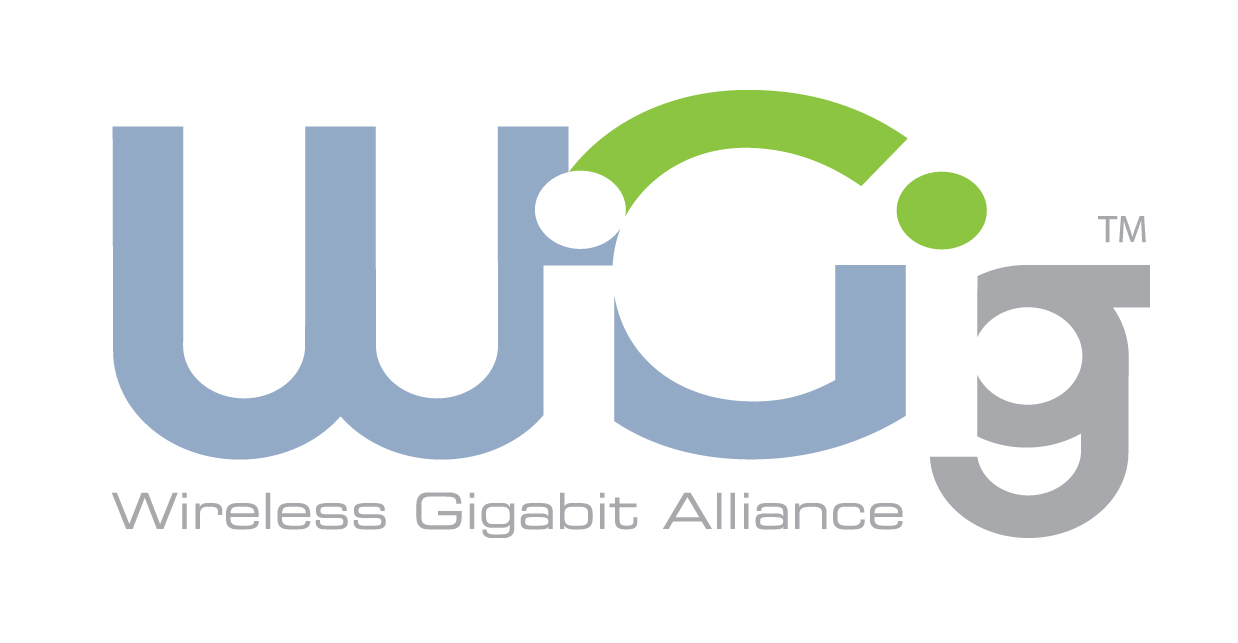

WiGig, alternatively known as 60 GHz Wi-Fi, refers to a set of 60 GHz wireless network protocols. It includes the current IEEE 802.11ad standard and also the IEEE 802.11ay standard.

The WiGig specification allows devices to communicate without wires at multi-gigabit speeds. It enables high-performance wireless data, display and audio applications that supplement the capabilities of previous wireless LAN devices. WiGig tri-band-enabled devices, which operate in the 2.4, 5 and 60 GHz bands, deliver data transfer rates up to 7 Gbit/s (for 11ad), about as fast as an 8-band 802.11ac transmission, and more than eleven times faster than the highest 802.11n rate, while maintaining compatibility with existing Wi-Fi devices. The 60 GHz millimeter wave signal cannot typically penetrate walls but can propagate by reflection from walls, ceilings, floors and objects using beamforming built into the WiGig system. When roaming away from 60 GHz coverage, the protocol can switch to make use of the other, lower bands, both of which can propagate through walls, with a much lower data rate where the higher rates are not needed.

802.11ay has a transmission rate of 20 to 40 Gbit/s and an extended transmission distance of 300 to 500 meters. 802.11ay should not be confused with the similarly named 802.11ax that was released in 2019. The 802.11ay standard is designed to run at much higher frequencies. The lower frequency of 802.11ax enables it to penetrate walls, something that the 11ay standard struggles to do. The name WiGig comes from Wireless Gigabit Alliance, the original association being formed to promote the adoption of IEEE 802.11ad. However, it is now certified by Wi-Fi Alliance.

== History ==
- In May 2009, formation of Wireless Gigabit Alliance was announced to promote the IEEE 802.11ad protocol.
- In December 2009, the completed version 1.0 WiGig specification was announced.
- In May 2010, WiGig Alliance announced the publication of its specification, the opening of its Adopter Program, and the liaison agreement with the Wi-Fi Alliance to cooperate on the expansion of Wi-Fi technologies.
- In June 2011, WiGig announced the release of its certification-ready version 1.1 specification.
- In December 2012, the IEEE Standards Association published IEEE 802.11ad-2012 as an amendment to the overall IEEE 802.11 standard family.
- In 2016, Wi-Fi Alliance launched certification program for WiGig products.
- The second generation WiGig standard, IEEE 802.11ay, was published on July 28, 2021.

== Specification ==
The WiGig MAC and PHY Specification, version 1.1 includes the following capabilities:

- Supports data transmission rates up to 7 Gbit/s – just over eleven times faster than the highest 802.11n rate
- Supplements and extends the 802.11 Media Access Control (MAC) layer and is backward compatible with the IEEE 802.11 standard
- Physical layer enables low power and high performance WiGig devices, guaranteeing interoperability and communication at gigabit per second rates
- Protocol adaptation layers are being developed to support specific system interfaces including data buses for PC peripherals and display interfaces for HDTVs, monitors and projectors
- Support for beamforming, enabling robust communication at up to 10 meters. The beams can move within the coverage area through modification of the transmission phase of individual antenna elements, which is called phased array antenna beamforming.
- Widely used advanced security and power management for WiGig devices

== Applications ==
On November 3, 2010, WiGig Alliance announced the WiGig version 1.0 A/V and I/O protocol adaptation layer (PAL) specifications. The application specifications have been developed to support specific system interfaces including extensions for PC peripherals and display interfaces for HDTVs, monitors and projectors.

WiGig Display Extension

- Supports wireless transmission of audio/visual data
- Enables wireless DisplayPort and other display interfaces that include the High-bandwidth Digital Content Protection 2.0 feature.
- Offers key A/V applications, such as the transmission of lightly compressed or uncompressed video from a computer or digital camera to an HDTV, monitor or projector

WiGig Bus Extension and WiGig Serial Extension. The WiGig Bus Extension (WBE) was available to members in 2011.

- Define high-performance wireless implementations of widely used computer interfaces over 60 GHz
- Enable multi-gigabit wireless connectivity between any two devices, such as connection to storage and other high-speed peripherals

== Competition ==
WiGig competes with other 60 GHz frequency band transmission standards like WirelessHD in some applications.

== Channels ==
60 GHz WiGig channels
Channel 2.16 GHz	Frequency (GHz)			Channel 4.32 GHz		Channel 6.48 GHz			Channel 8.64 GHz				Channel 1.08 GHz	Frequency (GHz)		
Channel 2.16 GHz	Center	Min.	Max.	Channel 4.32 GHz		Channel 6.48 GHz			Channel 8.64 GHz				Channel 1.08 GHz	Center	Min.	Max.
1	58.32	57.24	59.40	9	—N/a	17	—N/a	—N/a	25	—N/a	—N/a	—N/a	33	57.78	57.24	58.32
2	60.48	59.40	61.56	9	10	17	18	—N/a	25	26	—N/a	—N/a	34	58.86	58.32	59.40
3	62.64	61.56	63.72	11	10	17	18	19	25	26	27	—N/a	35	59.94	59.40	60.48
4	64.80	63.72	65.88	11	12	20	18	19	25	26	27	28	36	61.02	60.48	61.56
5	66.96	65.88	68.04	13	12	20	21	19	29	26	27	28	37	62.10	61.56	62.64
6	69.12	68.04	70.20	13	14	20	21	22	29	—N/a	27	28	38	63.18	62.64	63.72
7	71.28	70.20	72.36	15	14	—N/a	21	22	29	—N/a	—N/a	28	39	64.26	63.72	64.80
8	73.44	72.36	74.52	15	—N/a	—N/a	—N/a	22	29	—N/a	—N/a	—N/a	40	65.34	64.80	65.88

Regional spectrum allocations vary by region limiting the available number of channels in some regions. As of October 2016 the US is the only region supporting all six channels, while other regions are considering to follow suit.

== Single-carrier and Control-PHY data rates ==
MCS index	Modulation type	Coding rate	Phy rate (Mbit/s)	Sensitivity power (dBm)	Tx EVM (dB)
0 (Control-PHY)	DSSS with 32 π/2-BPSK chips per bit	1/2	27.5	−78	−6
1	π/2-BPSK (with each bit repeated twice)	1/2	385	−68	−6
2	π/2-BPSK	1/2	770	−66	−7
3	π/2-BPSK	5/8	962.5	−65	−9
4	π/2-BPSK	3/4	1155	−64	−10
5	π/2-BPSK	13/16	1251.25	−62	−12
6	π/2-QPSK	1/2	1540	−63	−11
7	π/2-QPSK	5/8	1925	−62	−12
8	π/2-QPSK	3/4	2310	−61	−13
9	π/2-QPSK	13/16	2502.5	−59	−15
10	π/2-16-QAM	1/2	3080	−55	−19
11	π/2-16-QAM	5/8	3850	−54	−20
12	π/2-16-QAM	3/4	4620	−53	−21

== OFDM data rates ==
The use of the OFDM mode is obsolete and removed in 802.11-2020.

MCS index	Modulation type	Coding rate	Phy rate (Mbit/s)	Sensitivity (dBm)	EVM (dB)
13	SQPSK	1/2	693	−66	−7
14	SQPSK	5/8	866.25	−64	−9
15	QPSK	1/2	1386	−63	−10
16	QPSK	5/8	1732.5	−62	−11
17	QPSK	3/4	2079	−60	−13
18	16-QAM	1/2	2772	−58	−15
19	16-QAM	5/8	3465	−56	−17
20	16-QAM	3/4	4158	−54	−19
21	16-QAM	13/16	4504.5	−53	−20
22	64-QAM	5/8	5197.5	−51	−22
23	64-QAM	3/4	6237	−49	−24
24	64-QAM	13/16	6756.75	−47	−26

== Low-power single-carrier data rates ==
MCS index	Modulation type	Coding rate	Phy rate (Mbit/s)	Sensitivity (dBm)	EVM (dB)
25	π/2-BPSK	13/28	626	−64	−7
26	π/2-BPSK	13/21	834	−60	−9
27	π/2-BPSK	52/63	1112	−57	−10
28	π/2-QPSK	13/28	1251	−57	−12
29	π/2-QPSK	13/21	1668	−57	−12
30	π/2-QPSK	52/63	2224	−57	−13
31	π/2-QPSK	13/14	2503	−57	−15

== See also ==
- IEEE 802.11ad
- IEEE 802.11ay
- IEEE 802.11aj
- Gi-Fi
- Bluetooth
- IEEE 802.15
- Media Agnostic USB
- Ultra-wideband (UWB)
- Wireless HDMI:
  - WiDi version 3.5 to 6.0 supports Miracast; discontinued
  - Miracast (wireless display technology)
  - WirelessHD
  - Wireless Home Digital Interface (WHDI)
- Wireless USB
- Zigbee
- LTE-WLAN Aggregation
- Wi-Fi Direct
- mmWave/FR2

ip based:

- Chromecast (proprietary media broadcast over ip: Google Cast for audio or audiovisual playback)
- AirPlay (proprietary ip based)
- Digital Living Network Alliance (DLNA) (ip based)

port / cable standard for mobile equipment

- Mobile High-Definition Link – MHL
- SlimPort (Mobility DisplayPort), also known as MyDP
