= Comparison of open-source wireless drivers =

Wireless network cards for computers require control software to make them function (firmware, device drivers). This is a list of the status of some open-source drivers for 802.11 wireless network cards.

== Linux ==
Marvell's "Libertas" runs an RTOS on an ARM9 and interfaces over a shim with the actual operating system.

=== Status ===
Driver family	Driver	Chipsets	Chipset PHY Modes	Integration in mainline	Non-free firmware required (Note: 'On Device' means firmware is stored in device at all times)	License	Development
adm8211	adm8211	ADMtek ADM8211 (802.11b MAC/BBP)	b	Yes	Yes	GPLv2	With support from Infineon / ADMtek
at76c50x‑usb	at76c50x-usb	Atmel AT76C503 / AT76C505 based USB WLAN adapters	b	Yes	Depends on the model	GPLv2	?
acx100	acx1xx	Texas Instruments ACX100, ACX111, TNETW1450	b/g	No	Yes	Dual BSD/MPL	Reverse-engineered
airo	airo airo	Cisco Systems Aironet 4500/4800 and 340/350	b	Yes	No	Dual GPLv2 and BSD	?
ath atheros	ar5523	Atheros AR5523 based USB dongles	a/b/g	Yes	Yes	ISC	Reverse-engineered
ath atheros	ath5k	Atheros AR2413, AR2414, AR2417, AR2425, AR5210, AR5211, AR5212, AR5213, AR5413, AR5414, AR5423, AR5424	a/b/g	Yes (since 2.6.25)	—N/a	Dual GPL/BSD	Reverse-engineered
ath atheros	ath6kl	Atheros AR6003, AR6004 (SDIO), AR6004 (USB)	a/b/g	Yes	Yes	ISC	Written by Atheros
ath atheros	ath9k	Atheros chips with 802.11n support	a/b/g/n	Yes (since 2.6.27)	—N/a proprietary blob only required for Bluetooth (Purism / NovaCustom)	ISC	Written by Atheros
ath atheros	ath9k_htc	Atheros AR9271, AR7010 (USB-PCIe bridge with AR928x chips)	b/g/n	Yes (since 2.6.35)	No	ISC	Written by Qualcomm Atheros
ath atheros	ath10k	Qualcomm Atheros chips with 802.11ac support	a/b/g/n /ac	Yes (since 3.11)	Yes	ISC	Written by Qualcomm Atheros
ath atheros	ath11k	Qualcomm Atheros chips with 802.11ax support	a/b/g/n /ac/ax	Yes (since 5.6)	Yes	ISC	Written by Qualcomm Atheros
ath atheros	ath12k	Qualcomm Atheros chips with 802.11be support	a/b/g/n /ac/ax/be	Yes (since 6.0)	Yes	ISC	Written by Qualcomm Atheros
ath atheros	carl9170	Atheros AR9170 (802.11n USB)	a/b/g/n	Yes (since 3.0)	No	GPL	Qualcomm Atheros-supported
ath atheros	wil6210	Wilocity wil6210, 802.11ad 60GHz	ad	Yes	Yes	ISC	Written by Qualcomm Atheros
atmel	atmel	Atmel at76c502 at76c504 and at76c506 wireless cards	b	Yes	Yes	GPLv2+	Reverse-engineered
b43	b43 b43	Broadcom BCM43xx SoC	a/b/g/n	Yes (since 2.6.24)	Experimental; OSS firmware	GPL	Reverse-engineered
b43legacy	b43legacy bcm43xx	Broadcom BCM4301, BCM4303, and BCM4306 rev 1 and 2	a/b/g	Yes (since 2.6.24)	Experimental; OSS firmware	GPL	Reverse-engineered
brcm80211	brcmfmac brcm80211	PCIe devices: Broadcom 4356, 43567, 43570, 4358, 4359, 43602, 4365, 4366; SDIO devices: Broadcom 4329, 4330, 4334, 43340, 43341, 43241, 4335, 4339, 43362, 43430, 43455, 4354, 43143; USB devices: Broadcom 43235, 43236, 43238, 43143, 43242, 43566, 43569	a/b/g/n /ac	Yes (since 3.2)	Yes	ISC	Written by Broadcom
brcm80211	brcmsmac	Broadcom BCM4313, BCM43224, BCM43225	a/b/g/n	Yes (since 3.2)	Yes	ISC	Written by Broadcom
cw1200	cw1200	ST-Ericsson CW1100 & CW1200 WLAN chipsets	?	Yes (since 3.11)	Yes	GPLv2	?
hostap	hostap HostAP	Intersil PRISM-II, PRISM-2.5, PRISM 3	?	Yes	Depends on the model	GPLv2	
ipw2x00	ipw2100 ipw2200	Intel PRO/Wireless 2100 and 2200 Network Connection (802.11b)	?	Yes	Yes	GPL	Written by Intel
iwlegacy	iwlegacy iwl3945 iwl4965	Intel Wireless Wi-Fi 3945ABG, 4965AGN	?	Yes	Yes	GPL	
iwlwifi	iwlwifi	Intel Wireless WiFi Next Gen AGN - Wireless-N/Advanced-N/Ultimate-N: 6250AGN, 6200AGN, 6300AGN, 1000BGN, 5150AGN, 5100AGN, 5300AGN, 5350AGN, 6005, 6030, 6150BGN, 100BGN, 130BGN, AX200, AX210 and BE200	a/b/g/n /ac/ax/be	Yes	Yes	Dual GPL/BSD	Written by Intel
libertas	libertas	Marvell 88W8686 SDIO Libertas 8388 (USB) 802.11b/g, 8385 (CompactFlash) 802.11b/g, 8385/8686/8688 (SDIO) 802.11b/g, 8686 (SPI) 802.11b/g, 88W8388	?	Yes	Yes	GPL	Marvell-supported
libertas_tf	libertas_tf	Marvell 8388 (USB) WLAN Thinfirm Driver (OLPC)	b/g	Yes	Yes	GPL	cozybit, Marvell-supported
mt76	mt76	MediaTek MT76xxx, MT79xxxx	a/b/g/n /ac/ax/be	Yes (since 4.19)	Yes	ISC	With support from MediaTek
mt7601u	mt7601u	MediaTek MT7601U	b/g/n	Yes (since 4.2)	Yes	GPLv2	
mwifiex	mwifiex	WiFi-Ex Driver for Marvell SD8786/SD8787/SD8797 (SDIO), 8766/8897 (PCIe) and 88W8797 (USB)	?	Yes	Yes	GPLv2	Written by Marvell
mwl8k	mwl8k	Marvell TopDog 802.11 Wireless cards: 88W8366, 88W8863, 88W8687, 88W8764	?	Yes	Yes	GPLv2	Written by Marvell
orinoco	orinoco	Lucent Hermes (WaveLAN/ ORiNOCO); Intersil PRISM-II, PRISM-2.5; Symbol Spectrum24 802.11b	?	Yes	Required for WPA support		
p54 prism54	p54	Prism54: Intersil/Conexant ISL3877, ISL3880, ISL3886, ISL3887, ISL3890	?	Yes (~Aug 2007)	Experimental; OSS firmware		
p54 prism54	prism54	Prism54: Intersil/Conexant ISL3877, ISL3880, ISL3886, ISL3887, ISL3890	?	Yes (before 2.6.12)	Experimental; OSS firmware		Reverse-engineered; obsoleted by p54.
rt2x00	rt2400pci	MediaTek (Ralink) RT2460	b	Yes (since 2.6.24)	No	GPLv2+	rt2x00.serialmonkey.com; From partial documentation and GPL drivers by Ralink
rt2x00	rt2500pci	Ralink RT2560	b/g	Yes	No	GPLv2+	rt2x00.serialmonkey.com
rt2x00	rt61pci	Ralink RT2561, RT2561S, RT2661	?	Yes	Yes	GPLv2+	rt2x00.serialmonkey.com
rt2x00	rt2800pci	Ralink RT2760, RT2790, RT2860, RT2880, RT2890, RT3052, RT3090, RT3091, RT3092; RT3390, RT3060, RT3062, RT3290, RT3562, RT3592, RT5390, RT5392	?	Yes	Yes	GPLv2+	rt2x00.serialmonkey.com
rt2x00	rt2500usb	Ralink RT2571 & RT2572	b/g	Yes	No	GPLv2+	rt2x00.serialmonkey.com
rt2x00	rt73usb	Ralink RT2571W, RT2573 & RT2671	?	Yes	Yes	GPLv2+	rt2x00.serialmonkey.com
rt2x00	rt2800usb	Ralink RT2770, RT2870, RT3070, RT3071, RT3072; RT3370, RT3572, RT5370, RT5572	?	Yes	Yes	GPLv2+	rt2x00.serialmonkey.com
rtl818x	rtl8180	Realtek RTL8180, RTL8185, RTL8187SE	b/g	Yes	No	GPL	
rtl818x	rtl8187	Realtek RTL8187, RTL8187B	a/b/g	Yes	No	GPL	
rtl8xxxu	rtl819x	Realtek RTL8723AU, RTL8723BU, RTL8188CUS, RTL8192CU, RTL8191EU, RTL8192EU, RTL8188EU, RTL8188RU, RTL8188FU, RTL8192FU	b/g/n	Yes	Yes	GPLv2	Community written, based on open-source drivers released by Realtek
rtlwifi rtl‑wifi	rtl8188ee	Realtek RTL8188EE	?	Yes (since 2.6.38)	Yes	GPL	Written by Realtek et al. Forked from rtl8180-sa2400 project.
rtlwifi rtl‑wifi	rtl8192c	Realtek RTL8192C	?	Yes		GPL	Written by Realtek et al.
rtlwifi rtl‑wifi	rtl8192ce	Realtek RTL8192CE	?	Yes	Yes	GPL	Written by Realtek et al.
rtlwifi rtl‑wifi	rtl8192cu	Realtek RTL8192CU	?	Yes	Yes	GPL	Written by Realtek et al.
rtlwifi rtl‑wifi	rtl8192de	Realtek RTL8192DE	?	Yes	Yes	GPL	Written by Realtek et al.
rtlwifi rtl‑wifi	rtl8192se	Realtek RTL8192SE	?	Yes	Yes	GPL	Written by Realtek et al.
rtlwifi rtl‑wifi	rtl8723ae	Realtek RTL8723AE	?	Yes	Yes	GPL	Written by Realtek et al.
rtlwifi rtl‑wifi	rtl8188eu	Realtek RTL8188EU (TP-Link TL-WN725N)	?	Yes (since 3.12)	Yes	GPL	Written by Realtek et al.
rtlwifi rtl‑wifi	rtl8821ae	Realtek RTL8812AE, RTL8821AE	a/b/g/n /ac	Yes (since 3.16)	Yes	GPL	?
rtw88 rtw89	rtw88_8822ce	Realtek RTL8822CE	a/b/g/n /ac	Yes	Yes	Dual GPLv2 and BSD	Written by Realtek et al.
rtw88 rtw89	rtw88_8822be	Realtek RTL8822BE	a/b/g/n /ac	Yes	Yes	Dual GPLv2 and BSD	Written by Realtek et al.
rtw88 rtw89	rtw88_8821ce	Realtek RTL8821CE	a/b/g/n /ac	Yes	Yes	Dual GPLv2 and BSD	Written by Realtek et al.
rtw88 rtw89	rtw88_8723de	Realtek RTL8723DE	b/g/n	Yes	Yes	Dual GPLv2 and BSD	Written by Realtek et al.
rtw88 rtw89	rtw88_8822cu	Realtek RTL8822CU	a/b/g/n /ac	Yes	Yes	Dual GPLv2 and BSD	Written by Realtek et al.
rtw88 rtw89	rtw88_8822bu	Realtek RTL8822BU	a/b/g/n /ac	Yes	Yes	Dual GPLv2 and BSD	Written by Realtek et al.
rtw88 rtw89	rtw88_8821cu	Realtek RTL8821CU	a/b/g/n /ac	Yes	Yes	Dual GPLv2 and BSD	Written by Realtek et al.
rtw88 rtw89	rtw88_8723du	Realtek RTL8723DU	b/g/n	Yes	Yes	Dual GPLv2 and BSD	Written by Realtek et al.
rtw89 rtw89	rtw89_8852ae	Realtek RTL8852AE	a/b/g/n /ac/ax	Yes	Yes	Dual GPLv2 and BSD	Written by Realtek et al.
rtw89 rtw89	rtw89_8852be	Realtek RTL8852BE	a/b/g/n /ac/ax	Yes	Yes	Dual GPLv2 and BSD	Written by Realtek et al.
rtw89 rtw89	rtw89_8852ce	Realtek RTL8852CE	a/b/g/n /ac/ax	Yes	Yes	Dual GPLv2 and BSD	Written by Realtek et al.
rsi9113	rsi9113	Redpine Signals SDIO and USB adapters		Yes		GPL	Written by Redpine Signals Inc.
ti	wl1251	Texas Instruments TI wl1251 (SDIO/SPI)	?	Yes	Yes	GPL	Written by Nokia
ti	wl12xx	Texas Instruments TI wl1271, wl1273, wl1281 and wl1283	?	Yes (Only up to 3.2)	Yes	GPL	Written by Nokia and Texas Instruments
ti	wl18xx	Texas Instruments TI WiLink 8	?	Yes	Yes	GPL	Written by Texas Instruments
zd1211rw	zd1211rw	ZyDAS ZD1211/ZD1211B (USB)	?	Yes	Yes	GPL	various

=== Driver capabilities ===
Driver	802.11							Bus interface	Wireless Security			Monitor mode	Master (AP) mode	Ad-Hoc mode
Driver	a	b	g	n	ac	ad	ax	Bus interface	WEP	WPA	WPA2	Monitor mode	Master (AP) mode	Ad-Hoc mode
acx1xx	No	Yes	Yes	No	No	?	?	PCI, Mini PCI, PC card, USB	Yes	No	No	Yes	Yes	?
adm8211	No	Yes	No	No	No	?	?	PCI	Yes	?	?	Yes	No	Yes
carl9170	Yes	Yes	Yes	Yes	No	?	?	USB	Yes	Yes	Yes	Yes	Yes	Yes
ath5k	Yes	Yes	Yes	No	No	?	No	PCI, Mini PCI, PC card, AHB	Yes	Yes	Yes	Yes	Yes (2.6.31)	Yes
ath9k	Yes	Yes	Yes	Yes	No	?	No	PCI, Mini PCI, Mini PCIe, AHB	Yes	Yes	Yes	Yes	Yes	Yes
ath9k_htc	Yes	Yes	Yes	Yes	No	?	No	USB	Yes	Yes	Yes	Yes	Yes	Yes
ath10k	Yes	Yes	Yes	Yes	Yes	?	No	PCI, Mini PCI, AHB, Mini PCIe	Yes	Yes	Yes	Yes	Yes	Yes
ath11k	Yes	Yes	Yes	Yes	Yes	?	Yes	PCI, Mini PCI, AHB, Mini PCIe	Yes	Yes	Yes	Yes	Yes	Yes
ath12k	Yes	Yes	Yes	Yes	Yes	?	Yes	PCI, Mini PCI, AHB, Mini PCIe	Yes	Yes	Yes	Yes	Yes	Yes
b43	No	Yes	Yes	No	No	?	No	PCI, Mini PCI, SDIO ?	Yes	Yes	Yes	Yes	Yes	Yes
bcm43xx	No	Yes	Yes	No	No	?	No	PCI, Mini PCI, Cardbus, PC card	Yes	Yes	Yes	Yes	No	?
brcmfmac	Yes	Yes	Yes	Yes	Yes	?	?	USB, SDIO, PCI Express	Yes	Yes	Yes	Exp.	Yes	No
brcmsmac	Yes	Yes	Yes	Yes	No	?	No	PCI, Mini PCI, Mini PCIe	Yes	Yes	Yes	Yes	Yes	Yes
hostap	No	Yes	No	No	No	?	?	PCI, Mini PCI, PC card	Yes	Yes	Yes	Yes	Yes	Yes
ipw2100	No	Yes	No	No	No	?	?	Mini PCI	Yes	Yes	Yes	Yes	?	?
ipw2200	Yes	Yes	Yes	No	No	?	?	Mini PCI	Yes	Yes	Yes	Yes	No	Yes
ipw2200-ap	No	Yes	Yes	No	No	?	?	Mini PCI	?	?	?	Yes	Yes	?
ipw3945	Yes	Yes	Yes	No	No	?	?	Mini PCI, Mini PCIe	Yes	Yes	Yes	Yes	No	Yes
islsm (p54u) (archive)	?	?	?	?	?	?	?	PCI, USB	No	No	No	?	No	?
iwlwifi (archive)	Yes	Yes	Yes	Yes	Yes	?	Yes	Mini PCI, Mini PCIe, M.2	Yes	Yes	Yes	Yes	2.4 GHz only Exp.	Yes
libertas (archive)	No	Yes	Yes	No	No	?	?	USB, CF, SDIO	?	?	?	?	No	?
madwifi (archive)	Yes	Yes	Yes	No	No	?	?	PCI, PC card, Mini PCI	Yes	Yes	Yes	Yes	Yes	Yes
mt76	Yes	Yes	Yes	Yes	Yes	?	Yes	PCIe, USB	Yes	Yes	Yes	Yes	Yes	Yes
mt7601u	No	Yes	Yes	Yes	No	?	?	USB	Yes	Yes	Yes	Yes	?	?
orinoco	No	Yes	No	No	No	?	?	Mini PCI, PC card	Yes	Yes	No	Yes	No	Yes
p54	No	Yes	Yes	No	No	?	?	Mini PCI, USB, Cardbus	Yes	Yes	Yes	Yes	Yes	Yes
prism54	No	Yes	Yes	No	No	?	?	PCI	Yes	No	?	Yes	Yes	?
rndis_wlan	No	Yes	Yes	No	No	?	?	USB	Yes	Yes	Yes	No	No	Yes
rt2x00	No	Yes	Yes	No	No	?	?	PCI, USB, Mini PCI	Yes	Yes	Yes	Yes	Yes	Yes
rtl818x	Yes	Yes	Yes	No	No	?	No	PCI, USB, PC card, Mini PCI	Yes	Yes	Yes	Yes	?	?
rtl8xxxu	No	Yes	Yes	Yes	No	No	No	USB	Yes	Yes	Yes	?	Yes	No
rtw88	No	Yes	Yes	Yes	Yes	No	No	M.2, USB, SDIO	Yes	Yes	Yes	Yes	Yes	Yes
rtw89	No	Yes	Yes	Yes	Yes	No	Yes	M.2	Yes	Yes	Yes	Yes	Yes	No
zd1201	No	Yes	No	No	No	?	?	USB	Yes	No	No	Yes	Yes	?
zd1211	Yes	Yes	Yes	No	No	?	?	USB	Yes	Yes	Yes	Yes	Yes	?
zd1211rw	No	Yes	Yes	No	No	?	?	USB	Yes	Yes	Yes	Yes	Yes	Yes

== DragonFly BSD ==
Driver name	Chipset	Integration	Non-free firmware required	License	Original/Primary developer	Development
acx	Texas Instruments; ACX100/ACX111	Integrated since 1.5	Yes	BSD		Reverse engineering
an	Aironet; 4500/4800	Integrated	On Device	BSD	Bill Paul (FreeBSD)	
ath	Atheros AR5210/ AR5211/AR5212/AR5416	Integrated	On Device	BSD		
bwi	Broadcom; BCM430x/4318	Integrated	Yes	BSD	Sepherosa; Ziehau	Reverse engineering
iwi	Intel PRO/Wireless; 2200BG/2915ABG	Integrated	Yes	BSD	Damien Bergamini (OpenBSD)	Reverse engineering
iwl	Intel PRO/Wireless; 2100	Integrated	Yes	BSD	Damien Bergamini (OpenBSD)	Reverse engineering
iwm	Intel Dual Band Wireless AC 3160/7260/8260/9260/9270/9560	Integrated	Yes	BSD	OpenBSD	
iwn	Intel 4965/1000/5000/ 5150/5300/6000/6050	Integrated	Yes	BSD	Damien Bergamini (OpenBSD)	Reverse engineering
ral	Ralink RT2500/ RT2501/RT2600	Integrated	On Device	BSD	Damien; Bergamini	Ported from FreeBSD
rtw	Realtek; RTL8180L	Integrated	On Device	BSD		Ported from NetBSD
rum	Ralink; RT2501USB/RT2601USB	Integrated	On Device	BSD	Damien; Bergamini	Ported from FreeBSD
wi	Lucent Hermes (WaveLAN / ORiNOCO); Intersil PRISM-II, -2.5; Symbol Spectrum24 802.11b	Integrated	On Device	BSD	Bill Paul (FreeBSD)	Documentation based
wpi	Intel; 3945ABG	Integrated	On Device	BSD	Damien; Bergamini	Ported from OpenBSD

== FreeBSD ==
=== Status ===
Driver	Chipset	Integration	Non-free firmware required	License	Original/ Primary developer	Development
acx	Texas Instruments; ACX100/ACX111	Separate project	Yes	BSD		Reverse engineering
an	Aironet 4500/4800, Cisco Aironet 340/350, Xircom Wireless Ethernet	Integrated	On Device	BSD	Bill Paul (FreeBSD)	
arl	Aironet Arlan 655	Integrated / Removed in 8.0	On Device	BSD		
ath	Atheros AR5210/ AR5211/ AR5212/ AR5416 /AR9130 /AR9160 /AR9280 /AR9285 /AR9287 /AR9565 (and derivatives)	Integrated	No	BSD	Originally by Atheros via Sam Leffler (FreeBSD); supported by the community	Documentation based
awi	AMD PCnetMobile	Integrated / Removed in 8.0	On Device	BSD	Bill Sommerfeld (NetBSD), Atsushi Onoe (NetBSD)	
bwi	Broadcom BCM43xx/4318	Integrated since 8.0	Yes	BSD	Sepherosa Ziehau (DragonFly BSD), Andrew Thompson (FreeBSD), Sam Leffler (FreeBSD)	Ported from DragonFly BSD
bwn	Broadcom; BCM43xx/4318 v4 firmware	Integrated since 8.1	Yes	BSD	Weongyo Jeong	?
cnw	Netwave AirSurfer	Integrated / Removed in 8.0	On Device	BSD	Imported from NetBSD	
ipw	Intel PRO/Wireless 2100	Integrated	Yes	BSD	Damien Bergamini (OpenBSD/ FreeBSD)	Reverse engineering
iwi	Intel PRO/Wireless; 2200BG/ 2225BG/ 2915ABG	Integrated	Yes	BSD	Damien Bergamini (OpenBSD/ FreeBSD)	Reverse engineering
iwm	Intel Dual Band Wireless-AC; 3160 / 3165 / 7260 / 7265 / 8260	?	?		?	?
iwn	Intel PRO/Wireless 4965 ABGN/ 5100/ 5300/ 5350/ 1000 Intel Centrino 6000/ 6150/ 6200/ 6205/ 6230/ 6250/ 6300	Integrated since 8.0 / Available for 7.1 and above as separate patch	Yes	BSD	Damien Bergamini, Benjamin Close, Sam Leffler (OpenBSD/ FreeBSD)	Reverse engineering
malo	Marvell 88W8335	Integrated	Yes	BSD	Weongyo Jeong (FreeBSD), Sam Leffler (FreeBSD)	
mwl	Marvell 88W8363	Integrated since 8.0	Yes	BSD	Sam Leffler (FreeBSD)	?
ral	Ralink RT2500/ RT2501/ RT2600/ RT3090/ RT3592	Integrated	On Device	BSD	Damien Bergamini (OpenBSD/ FreeBSD)	Based on partial documentation
ray	Raytheon Raylink/ Webgear Aviator	Integrated / Removed in 8.0	On Device	BSD	Imported from NetBSD	
rsu	Realtek; RTL8188SU/ RTL8192SU	Integrated since 10.0	Yes	BSD	Damien Bergamini (OpenBSD), Imported from OpenBSD by Rui Paulo	?
rum	Ralink; RT2501USB/ RT2601USB	Integrated	No	BSD	Niall O'Higgins, Damien Bergamini	Based on partial documentation
run	Ralink RT2700U/ RT2800U/ RT3000U	Integrated since 8.1	No	BSD	Damien Bergamini (OpenBSD), Imported from OpenBSD by Akinori Furukoshi	Based on partial documentation
uath	Atheros; AR5005UG/ AR5005UX	Integrated since 8.0	Yes	BSD	Weongyo Jeong (FreeBSD), Sam Leffler (FreeBSD)	?
upgt	GW3887 (Conexant/ Intersil PrismGT series)	Integrated since 8.0	Yes	BSD	Imported from OpenBSD	Reverse engineering
ural	Ralink RT2500USB	Integrated	On Device	BSD	Damien Bergamini (OpenBSD/ FreeBSD)	Based on partial documentation
urtw	Realtek; RTL8187L/ RTL8187B	Integrated since 8.0	—N/a	BSD	Weongyo Jeong (FreeBSD)	?
urtwn	Realtek RTL8188CU/ RTL8188EU/ RTL8192CU	Integrated since 10.0	Yes	BSD	Damien Bergamini (OpenBSD / FreeBSD)	Reverse engineering
wi	Lucent Hermes (WaveLAN/ ORiNOCO); Intersil PRISM-2, PRISM-2.5, PRISM-3; Symbol Spectrum24 802.11b (Symbol support removed in 8.0)	Integrated	On Device	BSD	Bill Paul (FreeBSD)	Documentation based
wpi	Intel PRO/ Wireless 3945ABG	Integrated	Yes	BSD	Damien Bergamini, Benjamin Close	Reverse engineering
zyd	ZyDAS ZD1211/ ZD1211B	Integrated	No	BSD	Florian Stoehr, Damien Bergamini, Jonathan Gray (OpenBSD)	Documentation based

=== Driver capabilities ===
Driver	802.11	Bus interface	WEP	WPA	WPA2	Monitor mode	Master mode	Ad-Hoc mode
acx	802.11a?, 802.11b, 802.11g	Cardbus, PCI	Yes	?	?	?	?	Yes
an	802.11b	Cardbus, PCI, ISA	Yes	?	?	?	?	Yes
arl	N/A	ISA	?	?	?	?	?	?
ath	802.11a, 802.11b, 802.11g, 802.11n	Cardbus, PCI, Mini PCI	Yes	Yes	Yes	Yes	Yes	Yes
awi	N/A	PC Card	?	?	?	?	Yes	Yes
bwi	802.11b, 802.11g	Cardbus, PCI	Yes	Yes	Yes	Yes	No	No
cnw	N/A	Cardbus	?	?	?	?	?	?
ipw	802.11b	Mini PCI	Yes	Yes	Yes	Yes	No	Yes
iwi	802.11a, 802.11b, 802.11g	Mini PCI	Yes	Yes	Yes	Yes	No	Yes
iwn	802.11a, 802.11b, 802.11g, 802.11n	Mini PCI	Yes	Yes	Yes	Yes	No	No
malo	802.11b, 802.11g	PCI	Yes	Yes	Yes	Yes	No	No
mwl	802.11a, 802.11b, 802.11g, 802.11n	PCI	Yes	Yes	Yes	Yes	Yes	No
ral	802.11a, 802.11b, 802.11g	Cardbus, PCI, Mini PCI	Yes	Yes	Yes	Yes	Yes	Yes
ray	N/A	PC Card	?	?	?	No	No	Yes
rum	802.11a, 802.11b, 802.11g	USB	Yes	Yes	Yes	Yes	Yes	Yes
run	802.11a, 802.11b, 802.11g	USB	Yes	Yes	Yes	Yes	Yes	Yes
uath	802.11b, 802.11g	USB	Yes	Yes	Yes	Yes	No	No
upgt	802.11b, 802.11g	USB	Yes	Yes	Yes	Yes	No	No
ural	802.11b, 802.11g	USB	Yes	Yes	Yes	Yes	Yes	Yes
urtw	802.11b, 802.11g	USB	Yes	Yes	Yes	Yes	No	No
wi	802.11b	PC Card, Cardbus, PCI	Yes	Yes (since 8.0)	Yes (since 8.0)	Yes (since 8.0?)	Yes	Yes
wpi	802.11a, 802.11b, 802.11g	Mini PCI	Yes	Yes	Yes	Yes	No	Yes
zyd	802.11b, 802.11g	USB	Yes	Yes	Yes	Yes	No	No

== NetBSD ==
Driver	Chipset	Integration	Free firmware (Note: 'N/A' means firmware is stored in device at all times, 'yes' means firmware is available for totally free redistribution, 'no' means you have to get into non-free-software contract with the manufacturer to get access to the firmware)	License	Original/Primary developer	Development methodologies	Free software (Note: in terms of no binary-only requirements that are posed by the driver, i.e. you can modify all code that is run on your CPU)
an	Aironet 4500/4800, Cisco Aironet 340/350	Integrated	—N/a	BSD	Bill Paul (FreeBSD)	Ported from FreeBSD	Yes
ath	Atheros AR521*/ AR2413/ AR2417/ AR5413/ AR5416/ AR5424/ AR9160	Integrated	—N/a	BSD	Sam Leffler (FreeBSD)	Binary blobs ported from FreeBSD	Yes
athn	Atheros AR5008 up to the AR9287	Integrated	—N/a	BSD	Damien Bergamini (OpenBSD)	Ported from OpenBSD	Yes
atu	Atmel at76c503/ at76c503a/ at76c505/ at76c505a	Integrated	—N/a	BSD	Dan Vreeken (FreeBSD)	Ported from OpenBSD	Yes
atw	ADMtek ADM8211	Integrated	—N/a	BSD	David Young (NetBSD)		Yes
awi	AMD PCnetMobile	Integrated	—N/a	BSD			Yes
bwi	Broadcom BCM430x/4318	Integrated	—N/a	BSD	Sepherosa Ziehau (DragonflyBSD)	Ported from Dragonfly BSD	Yes
cnw	Netwave AirSurfer	Integrated	—N/a	BSD			Yes
ipw	Intel PRO/Wireless 2100	Integrated	No	BSD	Damien Bergamini (OpenBSD)	Ported from OpenBSD	Yes
iwi	Intel PRO/Wireless 2200BG/2915ABG	Integrated	No	BSD	Damien Bergamini (OpenBSD)	Ported from OpenBSD	Yes
iwm	Intel Wireless WiFi 7260, 7265, 3160	Integrated	No	BSD	Antti Kantee (NetBSD)		Yes
iwn	Intel Wireless WiFi Link 4965/ 5000/ 1000/ 6000	Integrated	No	BSD	Damien Bergamini (OpenBSD)	Ported from OpenBSD	Yes
malo	Marvell 88W8335/88W8310	Integrated	No	BSD	Claudio Jeker (OpenBSD)	Ported from OpenBSD	Yes
otus	Atheros AR9001U	Integrated	No	BSD	Damien Bergamini (OpenBSD)	Ported from OpenBSD	Yes
ral	Ralink RT2500/ RT2501/ RT2600/ RT2500USB/RT3592	Integrated	—N/a	BSD	Damien Bergamini (OpenBSD)	Ported from OpenBSD	Yes
ray	Raytheon Raylink / WebGear Aviator	Integrated	—N/a	BSD	Christian E. Hopps (NetBSD)		Yes
rtw	Realtek RTL8180L	Integrated	—N/a	BSD	David Young (NetBSD)		Yes
rtwn	Realtek RTL8188CE and RTL8192CE	Integrated	—N/a	BSD	Stefan Sperling (OpenBSD)	Ported from OpenBSD	Yes
run	Ralink RT2700U, RT2800U and RT3000U	Integrated	—N/a	BSD	Damien Bergamini (OpenBSD)	Ported from OpenBSD	Yes
upgt	Conexant/Intersil PrismGT SoftMAC USB IEEE 802.11b/g	Integrated	—N/a	BSD	Marcus Glocker (OpenBSD)	Ported from OpenBSD	Yes
urtw	Realtek RTL8187B/L	Integrated	No	BSD	Weongyo Jeong (FreeBSD)	Ported from FreeBSD	Yes
urtwn	Realtek RTL8188CUS, RTL8188CE-VAU, RTL8188EUS, RTL8188RU, and RTL8192CU	Integrated	No	BSD	Damien Bergamini (OpenBSD)	Ported from OpenBSD	Yes
wi	Lucent Technologies WaveLAN/IEEE and PRISM-II 802.11	Integrated	No	BSD	Bill Paul		Yes
wpi	Intel PRO/Wireless 3945ABG	Integrated	No	BSD	Damien Bergamini (OpenBSD)	Ported from OpenBSD	Yes
zyd	ZyDAS ZD1211/ ZD1211B	Integrated	No	BSD	Damien Bergamini (OpenBSD)	Ported from OpenBSD	Yes

== OpenBSD ==
The following is an incomplete list of supported wireless devices:

=== Status ===
Driver	Chipset	Integration	Free firmware	License	Original/Primary developer	Development	Free software
acx	Texas Instruments ACX100/ACX111	Integrated	No	BSD	Ported from DragonFlyBSD	Reverse engineering	Yes
an	Aironet 4500/4800, Cisco Aironet 340/350	Integrated	—N/a	BSD			Yes
ath	Atheros AR5210/ AR5211/ AR5212	Integrated	—N/a	BSD		Reverse engineering	Yes
athn	Atheros AR5416/AR9160/AR928X	Integrated (since 4.7)	Yes	BSD	Damien Bergamini	Partly based on the ath9k driver for Linux	Yes
atu	Atmel AT76C503/ AT76C503A/ AT76C505/ AT76C505A	Integrated	Yes	BSD		Reverse engineering	Yes
atw	ADMtek ADM8211	Integrated	—N/a	BSD		Documentation based	Yes
awi	BayStack 650	2.7 to 4.3	—N/a	BSD			Yes
bwfm	Broadcom and Cypress IEEE 802.11a/ac/ax/b/g/n wireless network device	6.3+		BSD	Patrick Wildt		Yes
bwi	Broadcom BCM430x/4318	Integrated	No	BSD	Sepherosa Ziehau	Ported from DragonFly BSD	Yes
cnw	NetWave AirSurfer	2.6 to 6.0	—N/a	BSD			Yes
ipw	Intel PRO/Wireless 2100	Integrated	No	BSD	Damien Bergamini	Reverse engineering	Yes
iwi	Intel PRO/Wireless 2200BG/ 2225BG/ 2915ABG	Integrated	No	BSD	Damien Bergamini	Reverse engineering	Yes
iwn	Intel Wireless WiFi Link 4965/ 5000/ 1000/ 6000	Integrated	No	BSD	Damien Bergamini	Reverse engineering	Yes
iwm	Intel Wireless WiFi Link 3160ac/ 7260ac/ 7265ac	Integrated (since 5.8)	No	BSD	Antti Kantee, Stefan Sperling	Based on iwn, and iwlwifi driver released by Intel for Linux under dual GPLv2/BSD license	Yes
malo	Marvell 88W8335/ 88W8310	Integrated	No	BSD	Marcus Glocker and Claudio Jeker	Reverse engineering	Yes
otus	Atheros AR9170	Integrated (since 4.6)	No	BSD	Damien Bergamini	Based on source code released by Atheros for Linux under the ISC	Yes
pgt	Conexant/Intersil Prism GT Full-MAC ISL3877, ISL3880, and ISL3890 chips	Integrated	No	BSD	Ported from FreeBSD	Reverse engineering	Yes
ral/ural	Ralink RT2500, RT2501, RT2600, RT2700, RT2800, RT3090, RT3292, RT3592 and RT5390 (ral), RT2500USB (ural)	Integrated	Yes	BSD	Damien Bergamini	Documentation based	Yes
ray	Raytheon Raylink/WebGear Aviator IEEE 802.11FH	2.7 to 5.4	—N/a	BSD			Yes
rsu	Realtek RTL8188SU/RTL8191SU/RTL8192SU	Integrated (since 4.9)	No	BSD	Damien Bergamini	Reverse engineering	Yes
rtw	Realtek RTL8180L	Integrated	—N/a	BSD	Ported from NetBSD	Documentation based	Yes
rtwn	Realtek RTL8188CE/RTL8192CE	Integrated	No	BSD	Stefan Sperling	Based on urtwn driver.	Yes
rum	Ralink RT2501USB/ RT2601USB	Integrated	Yes	BSD	Niall O'Higgins and Damien Bergamini	Documentation based	Yes
run	Ralink RT2700U/ RT2800U/ RT3000U	Integrated	Yes	BSD	Damien Bergamini	Documentation based	Yes
uath	Atheros AR5005UG/ AR5005UX	Integrated	No	BSD	Damien Bergamini	Reverse Engineering	Yes
upgt	GW3887 (Conexant/Intersil PrismGT series)	Integrated	No	BSD	Marcus Glocker	Reverse engineering	Yes
urtw	Realtek RTL8187L	Integrated	—N/a	BSD	Weongyo Jeong (FreeBSD)	?	Yes
urtwn	Realtek RTL8188CU/RTL8192CU	Integrated (since 4.9)	No	BSD	Damien Bergamini	Reverse engineering	Yes
wi	Lucent Hermes (WaveLAN/ ORiNOCO); Intersil PRISM-2, PRISM-2.5, PRISM-3; Symbol Spectrum24	Integrated	Yes for Spectrum24 and N/A for others	BSD	Bill Paul	Documentation based	Yes
wpi	Intel PRO/Wireless 3945ABG	Integrated	No	BSD	Damien Bergamini	Reverse engineering	Yes
zyd	ZyDAS ZD1211/ZD1211B	Integrated	Yes	BSD	Florian Stoehr, Damien Bergamini, and Jonathan Gray	Documentation based	Yes

=== Driver capabilities ===
Driver	802.11	Bus interface	WEP	WPA	WPA2	Monitor mode	Master mode	Ad-Hoc mode
acx	802.11a, 802.11b, 802.11g	Cardbus, PCI	Yes	No	No	Yes	Yes	Yes
an	802.11b	PC Card, PCI, ISA	Yes	No	No	Yes	No	Yes
ath	802.11a, 802.11b, 802.11g	Cardbus, PCI	Yes	Yes	Yes	Yes	Yes	Yes
athn	802.11a, 802.11b, 802.11g, 802.11n	Cardbus, PCI-E, Mini PCIE	Yes	Yes	Yes	Yes	Yes	No
atu	802.11b	USB	Yes	No	No	No	No	Yes
atw	802.11b	Cardbus, PCI	No	No	No	No	No	Yes
bwfm	802.11a/ac/ax/b/g/n	PCI, USB	Yes	Yes	Yes	Yes	Yes	No
bwi	802.11b, 802.11g	Cardbus, PCI	Yes	Yes	Yes	Yes	No	No
cnw	N/A	PC Card	No	No	No	No	No	No
ipw	802.11b	PCI	Yes	Yes	Yes	Yes	No	Yes
iwi	802.11a, 802.11b, 802.11g	PCI	Yes	Yes	Yes	Yes	No	Yes
iwn	802.11a, 802.11b, 802.11g, 802.11n	PCI-E, Mini PCIE	Yes	Yes	Yes	Yes	No	No
iwm	802.11a, 802.11b, 802.11g, 802.11n	PCI-E, Mini PCIE	Yes	Yes	Yes	Yes	No	No
malo	802.11b, 802.11g	Cardbus, PC Card, PCI	Yes	Yes	Yes	Yes	No	No
otus	802.11a, 802.11b, 802.11g	USB	Yes	Yes	Yes	Yes	No	No
pgt	802.11a, 802.11b, 802.11g	Cardbus, PCI	Yes	No	No	Yes	Yes	Yes
ral	802.11a, 802.11b, 802.11g	Cardbus, PCI, Mini PCI	Yes	Yes	Yes	Yes	Yes	Yes
ray	N/A	PC Card	No	No	No	No	No	Yes
rtw	802.11b	Cardbus, PCI	Yes	No	No	Yes	Yes	Yes
rtwn	802.11b, 802.11g	Mini PCIE	Yes	Yes	Yes	Yes	No	No
rum	802.11a, 802.11b, 802.11g	USB	Yes	Yes	Yes	Yes	Yes	Yes
run	802.11a, 802.11b, 802.11g	USB	Yes	Yes	Yes	Yes	No	No
uath	802.11a, 802.11b, 802.11g	USB	Yes	No	No	Yes	No	No
upgt	802.11b, 802.11g	USB	Yes	Yes	Yes	Yes	No	No
ural	802.11b, 802.11g	USB	Yes	Yes	Yes	Yes	Yes	Yes
urtw	802.11b, 802.11g	USB	Yes	Yes	Yes	Yes	No	No
urtwn	802.11b, 802.11g	USB	Yes	Yes	Yes	Yes	No	No
wi	802.11b	PC Card, PCI, USB	Yes	No	No	No	Yes	Yes
wpi	802.11a, 802.11b, 802.11g	PCI	Yes	Yes	Yes	Yes	No	No
zyd	802.11b, 802.11g	USB	Yes	Yes	Yes	Yes	No	No

== Solaris and OpenSolaris ==
Driver	Chipset	Integration	Free firmware	License	Development	Free software
ath	Atheros AR5211/ AR5212/ AR5213/ AR5214	Integrated with Solaris Nevada build 29	No firmware required	Dual GPL/BSD with proprietary HAL	Port of Madwifi	No
ipw	Intel PRO/Wireless 2100	Community project	No	BSD	Ported from OpenBSD	Yes
iwi	Intel PRO/Wireless 2200BG/2225BG/2915ABG	Community project	No	BSD	Ported from OpenBSD	Yes
pcan	Cisco Aironet 340/350	Community project	—N/a	BSD	Ported from FreeBSD	Yes
pcwl	Lucent/Agere Systems Hermes (WaveLAN/ORiNOCO), Intersil PRISM-2 802.11b	Community project	—N/a	BSD	Ported from FreeBSD	Yes
ral	Ralink RT2500	Community project	—N/a	BSD	Ported from OpenBSD	Yes
rtw	Realtek RTL8180L	Community project	—N/a	BSD	Ported from NetBSD	Yes
malo	Marvell 88W8335/ 88W8310	Community project	—N/a	BSD	Ported from OpenBSD	Yes
wpi	Intel PRO/Wireless 3945ABG	Community project	No	BSD	Ported from OpenBSD	Yes
iwk	Intel Wireless WiFi Link 4965AGN	Community project	No	BSD	Ported from OpenBSD	Yes
arn	Atheros 9000	Community project	No	BSD	based on ath9k	Yes
rwd	Ralink RT2561/RT2561S/RT2661	Community project	No	BSD		Yes
rwn	Ralink RT2700/2800	Community project	No	BSD		Yes
urtw	Realtek RTL8187L/B USB	Community project	No	BSD		Yes
atu	Atmel AT76C50x	Community project	No	BSD		Yes
mwl	Marvell 88W8363	Community project	No	BSD		Yes
ural	Ralink RT2500USB	Community project	No	BSD		Yes
zyd	ZyDAS ZD1211 chipsets	Community project	Yes	BSD	Ported from OpenBSD	Yes

== Darwin, OpenDarwin and macOS ==
Driver	Chipset	Free firmware	License	Development
IWIDarwin	Intel PRO/Wireless 2100/2200BG/2225BG/2915ABG/3945ABG/4965AGN	No	GPL	Port from Linux
WirelessDriver	Lucent/Agere Systems Hermes (WaveLAN/ORiNOCO), Intersil PRISM-2 802.11b	—N/a	BSD	
"GTdriver". Archived from the original on 2021-06-14.	PRISM-GT 802.11b/g	—N/a	GPL	
