= ORiNOCO =

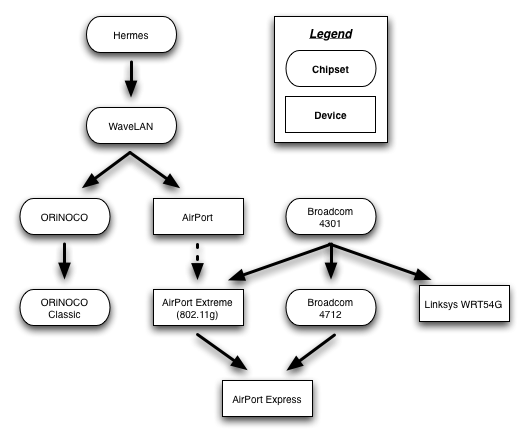
Chipsets

ORiNOCO was the brand name for a family of wireless networking technology by Proxim Wireless (previously Lucent). These integrated circuits (codenamed Hermes) provide wireless connectivity for 802.11-compliant Wireless LANs.

== Variants ==
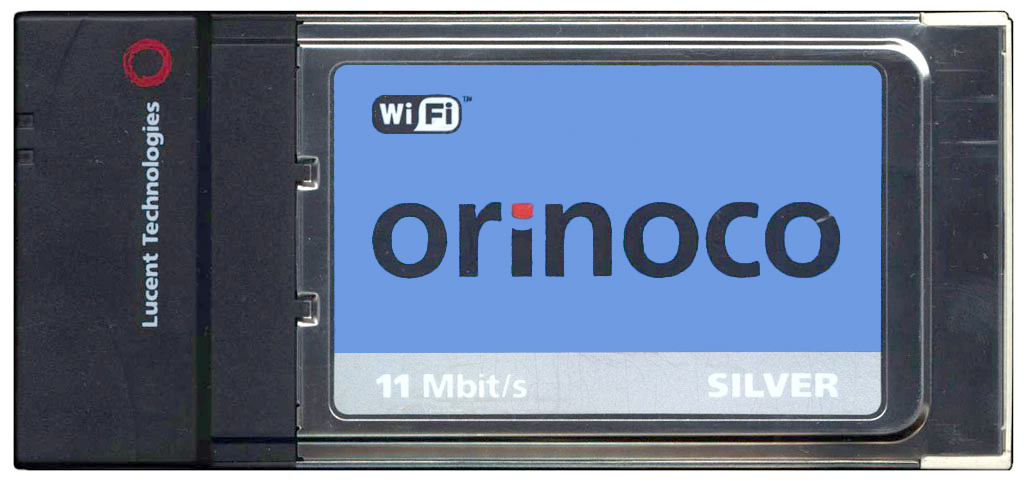
ORiNOCO Silver PC card

Lucent offered several variants of the PC Card, referred to by different color-based monikers:

- White/Bronze: WaveLAN IEEE Standard 2 Mbit/s PC Cards with 802.11 support.
- Silver: WaveLAN IEEE Turbo 11 Mbit/s PC Cards with 802.11b and 64-bit WEP support.
- Gold: WaveLAN IEEE Turbo 11 Mbit/s PC Cards with 802.11b and 128-bit WEP support.

Later models dropped the 'Turbo' moniker due to 802.11b 11 Mbit/s becoming widespread.

Proxim, after taking over Lucent's wireless division, rebranded all their wireless cards to ORiNOCO - even cards not based on Lucent/Agere's Hermes chipset. Proxim still offers ORiNOCO-based cards under the 'Classic' brand.

== Rebranded products ==
The WaveLAN chipsets that power ORiNOCO-branded cards were commonly used to power other wireless networking devices, and are compatible with a number of other access points, routers and wireless cards. The following brand and models utilise the chipset, or are rebrands of an ORiNOCO product:

- 3Com AirConnect
- Apple AirPort and AirMac cards (original only, not AirPort Extreme). Modified to remove the antenna stub.
- Avaya World Card
- Cabletron RoamAbout 802.11 DS
- Compaq WL100 11 Mbit/s Wireless Adapter
- Intersil/Conexant Prism II
- D-Link DWL-650
- ELSA AirLancer MC-11
- Enterasys RoamAbout
- Ericsson WLAN Card C11
- Farallon SkyLINE
- Fujitsu RoomWave
- HyperLink Wireless PC Card 11 Mbit/s
- Intel PRO/Wireless 2011
- Lucent Technologies WaveLAN/IEEE Orinoco
- Melco WLI-PCM-L11
- Microsoft Wireless Notebook Adapter MN-520
- NCR WaveLAN/IEEE Adapter
- Proxim LAN PC CARD HARMONY 80211B
- Samsung 11 Mbit/s WLAN Card
- Symbol LA4111 Spectrum24 Wireless LAN PC Card
- Toshiba Wireless LAN Mini PCI Card

== Preferred wireless chipset for wardriving ==
The ORiNOCO (and their derivatives) is preferred by wardrivers, due to their high sensitivity and the ability to report the level of noise (something that other chips of the era did not report). The pre-Proxim (or 'Classic') ORiNOCO cards have a jack for attaching an external antenna.

== Linux drivers ==
A Linux Orinoco Driver supported the IEEE 802.11b Hermes/ORiNOCO family of chips. It was included in the Linux kernel from version 2.4.3 until its removal in 6.8.
