= PubWatch =

UK safety scheme for bars and pubs

The National Pubwatch Logo
- This display alerts the malcontent to beware of the increased scrutiny in-place, and satisfies the general safety concerns of the welcomed patron.
- Sign on a pub in London

A Pubwatch scheme in the United Kingdom is a partnership where licensees unify as an independent group to preempt crime and anti-social behaviour in licensed premises. Founded in the late 1990s by licensees Bill Stone and Raoul De Vaux, along with police superintendent Malcolm Eidmans, the Pubwatch organization works closely with local authorities and intends to maintain a safe and secure social environment for customers and staff. Law enforcement supports the Pubwatch, as it works in concert with public safety campaigns, and alcohol awareness initiatives.

== Operations ==
Pubwatch schemes operate within city limits, towns, and villages across the UK. Customers to a licensed premises that operates a Pubwatch scheme are informed of the operating Pubwatch scheme through the use of advertising media such as posters and window stickers. This allows pub and bar owners to collaborate to deter perpetrators from re-offending by way of a semi-permanent punishment.

== Objectives ==
- To tackle and prevent anti-social behaviour through effective communication and the prompt reporting of anti-social behaviour and criminal activity.
- To promote a sense of security for customer and staff.
- To improve police/licensee liaison by providing effective communications through Two-way radio (usually via a community radio repeater) and dedicated online services such as PubwatchOnline.

== Schemes ==
Pubwatch schemes vary in size and are headed by a coordinator and meet as a group on a regular basis to discuss problems that have occurred on or near licensed premises. Although Pubwatch schemes are supported by police who can offer help and advice, it must be recognised that the scheme is not run by police.

== Pubwatch taking action ==
Pubwatch schemes may take action against individuals for anti-social behaviour in licensed premises. This action may be in the form of a ban. by way of all of members of the individual scheme exercising their common law right to exclude someone from their pubs. The group will not tolerate behaviour such as verbal abuse, violence, theft, drug taking/selling and vandalism. A vote to determine the action against these individuals is called at meetings. Action taken usually ranges from written warnings, to 'banning orders' where the individual, for a set period of time, is not allowed to enter any of the licensed premises operated by the members of the Pubwatch group. Some individuals who have been subjected to a Pubwatch banning order have unsuccessfully sought judicial review of the decisions.

== Enforcement ==
The effectiveness of the Pubwatch initiative is mainly dependent on good communication and effective distribution of information. The preferred way of communication is by two-way radios that are available to each member. The police can be contacted directly on these radios. Individuals who are the subject of banning orders are identified by photographs that are circulated after action is taken against them. The photographs are normally circulated manually by police officers but digital circulation is being increasingly used by the schemes for improved efficiency.

== See also ==
- Shopwatch
