= Ralink =

Wi-Fi chipset manufacturer

Ralink Technology, Corp.
- Company type: Subsidiary
- Industry: Semiconductor
- Founded: 2001; 25 years ago, Cupertino, California
- Headquarters: Hsinchu, Taiwan
- Products: Wi-Fi chipset
- Parent: MediaTek

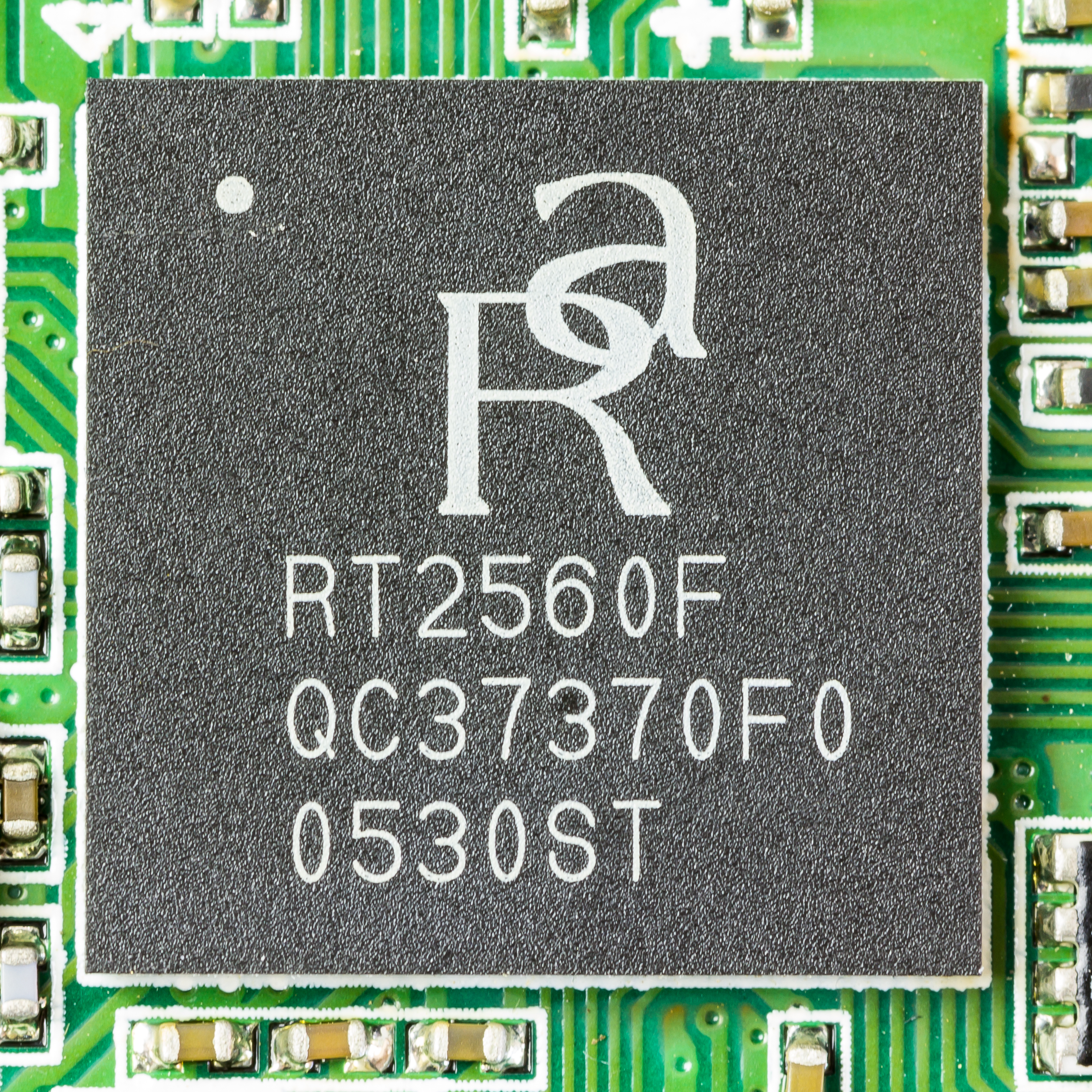
Ralink RT2560F on a Wi-Fi Mini PCI Card

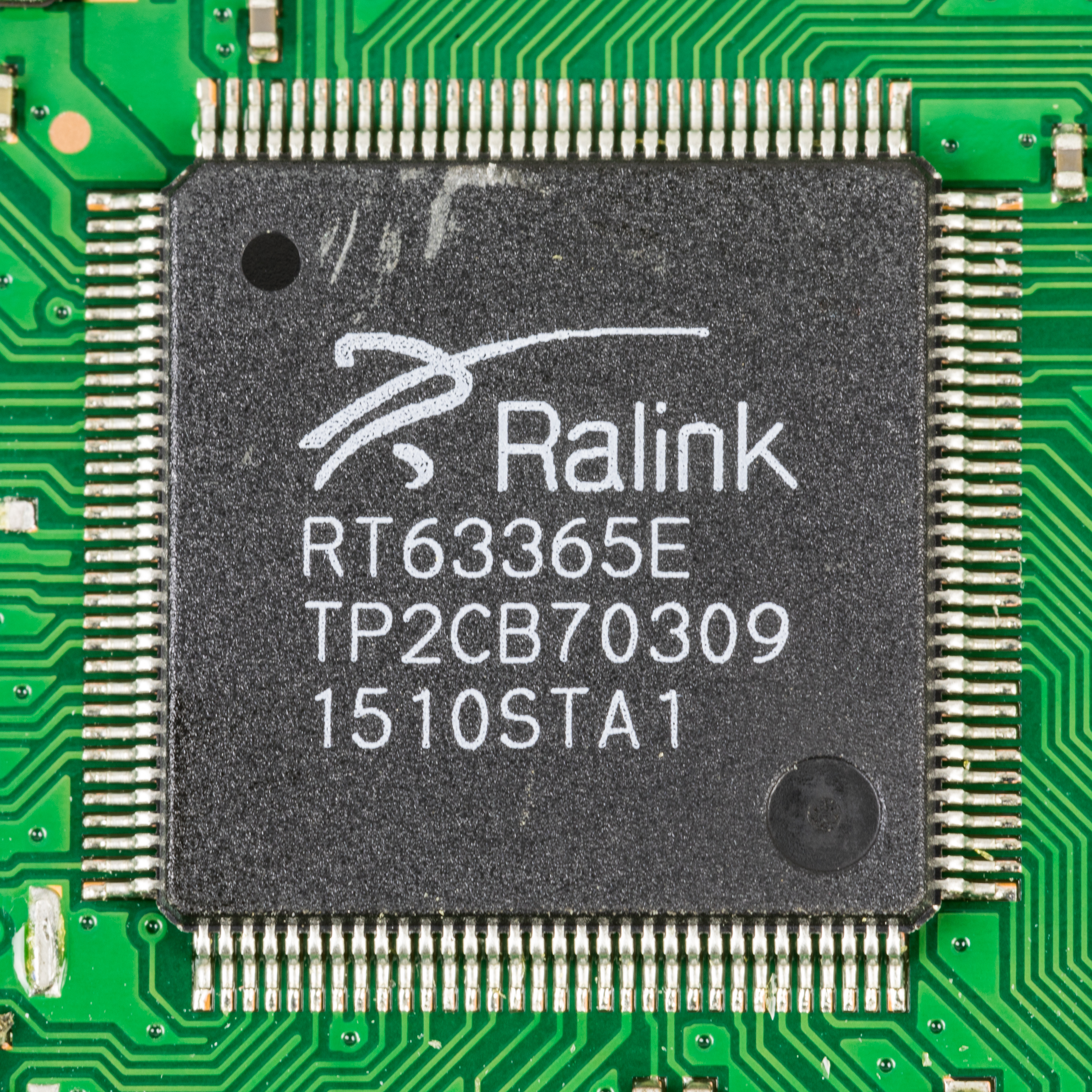
Ralink RT63365E on a Wi-Fi router and access point from Huawei

Ralink Technology, Corp. is a Wi-Fi chipset manufacturer mainly known for their IEEE 802.11 (Wireless LAN) chipsets. Ralink was founded in 2001 in Cupertino, California, then moved its headquarters to Hsinchu, Taiwan. On 5 May 2011, Ralink was acquired by MediaTek.

Some of Ralink's 802.11n RT2800 chipsets have been accepted into the Wi-Fi Alliance 802.11n draft 2.0 core technology testbed. They have also been selected in the Wi-Fi Protected Setup (WPS) and Wireless Multimedia Extensions Power Save (WMM-PS) testbeds. Ralink was a participant in the Wi-Fi Alliance and the IEEE 802.11 standards committees. Ralink chipsets are used in various consumer-grade routers made by Gigabyte Technology, Linksys, D-Link, Asus and Belkin, as well as Wi-Fi adaptors for USB, PCI, ExpressCard, PC Card, and PCI Express interfaces. An example of an adapter is the Nintendo Wi-Fi USB Connector which uses the Ralink RT2570 chipset to allow a Nintendo DS or Wii to be internetworked via a home computer.

== Operating systems support ==
Ralink provides some documentation without a non-disclosure agreement. This includes datasheets of their PCI and PCIe chipsets, but for now does not include documentation of their system on a chip used in Wireless routers.

=== Linux ===
Drivers for MediaTek Ralink wireless network interface controllers were mainlined into the Linux kernel version 2.6.24. (See Comparison of open-source wireless drivers.) Ralink provides GNU General Public License-licensed (GPL) drivers for the Linux kernel. While Linux drivers for the older RT2500 chipsets are no longer updated by Ralink, these are now being maintained by Serialmonkey's rt2x00 project. Current Ralink chipsets require a firmware to be loaded. Ralink allows the use and redistribution of firmware, but does not allow its modification.

== See also ==
- List of companies of Taiwan
