= Radio repeater =

Radio signal retransmitter

A radio repeater is a combination of a radio receiver and a radio transmitter that receives a signal and retransmits it, so that two-way radio signals can cover longer distances. A repeater sited at a high elevation can allow two mobile stations, otherwise out of line-of-sight propagation range of each other, to communicate. Repeaters are found in professional, commercial, and government mobile radio systems and also in amateur radio.

Repeater systems use two different radio frequencies; the mobiles transmit on one frequency, and the repeater station receives those transmissions and transmits on a second frequency. Since the repeater must transmit at the same time as the signal is being received, and may even use the same antenna for both transmitting and receiving, frequency-selective filters are required to prevent the receiver from being overloaded by the transmitted signal. Some repeaters use two different frequency bands to provide isolation between input and output or as a convenience.

In a communications satellite, a transponder serves a similar function, but the transponder does not necessarily demodulate the relayed signals.

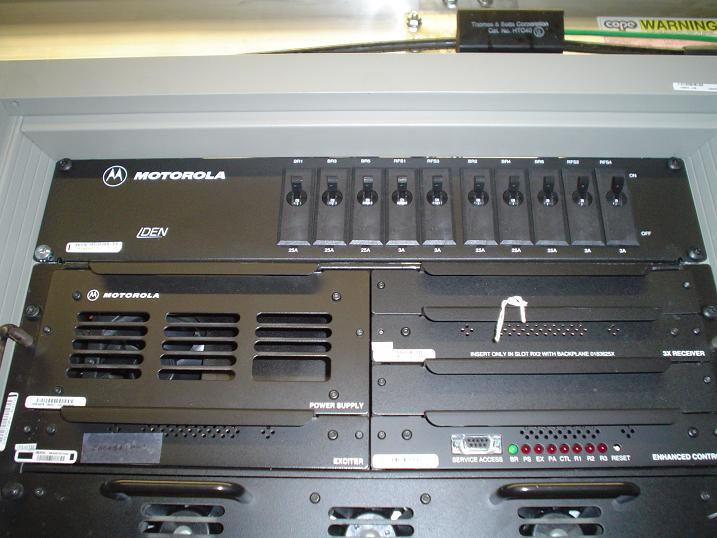
A continuous-duty, rack-mount iDEN digital trunked system repeater at a cell site.

== Full duplex operation ==
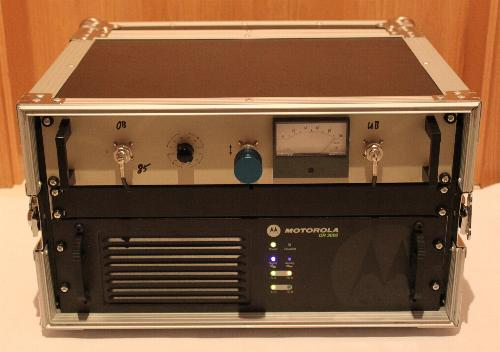
Motorola MOTOTRBO Repeater DR3000 with duplexer mounted in Flightcase, 100% Duty cycle up to 40 W output

A repeater is an automatic radio-relay station, usually located on a mountain top, tall building, or radio tower. It allows communication between two or more bases, mobile or portable stations that are unable to communicate directly with each other due to distance or obstructions between them.

The repeater receives on one radio frequency (the "input" frequency), demodulates the signal, and simultaneously re-transmits the information on its "output" frequency. All stations using the repeater transmit on the repeater's input frequency and receive on its output frequency. Since the repeater is usually located at an elevation higher than the other radios using it, its range is greatly extended.

Because the transmitter and receiver are on at the same time, isolation must exist to keep the repeater's own transmitter from degrading the repeater receiver. If the repeater transmitter and receiver are not isolated well, the repeater's own transmitter desensitizes the repeater receiver. The problem is similar to being at a rock concert and not being able to hear the weak signal of a conversation over the much stronger signal of the band.

In general, isolating the receiver from the transmitter is made easier by maximizing, as much as possible, the separation between input and output frequencies.

When operating through a repeater, mobile stations must transmit on a different frequency than the repeater output. Although the repeater site must be capable of simultaneous reception and transmission (on two different frequencies), mobile stations can operate in one mode at a time, alternating between receiving and transmitting; so, mobile stations do not need the bulky and costly filters required at a repeater site. Mobile stations may have an option to select a "talk around" mode to transmit and receive on the same frequency; this is sometimes used for local communication within range of the mobile units.

== Frequency separation: input to output ==
There is no set rule about spacing of input and output frequencies for all radio repeaters. Any spacing where the designer can get sufficient isolation between receiver and transmitter will work.

In some countries, under some radio services, there are agreed-on conventions or separations that are required by the system license. In the case of input and output frequencies in the United States, for example:

- Amateur repeaters in the 144–148 MHz band usually use a 600 kHz (0.6 MHz) separation, in the 1.25-meter band use a 1.6 MHz separation, in the 420–450 MHz band use a 5 MHz separation, and in the 902–928 MHz band use a 25 MHz separation.
- Systems in the 450–470 MHz band use a 5 MHz separation with the input on the higher frequency. Example: input is 456.900 MHz; output is 451.900 MHz.
- Systems in the 806–869 MHz band use a 45 MHz separation with the input on the lower frequency. Example: input is 810.1875 MHz; output is 855.1875 MHz.
- Military systems are suggested to use no less than a 10 MHz spacing.

These are just a few examples. There are many other separations or spacings between input and output frequencies in operational systems.

=== Same band frequencies ===
Same band repeaters operate with input and output frequencies in the same frequency band. For example, in the US, two-way radio, 30–50 MHz is one band and 150–174 MHz is another. A repeater with an input of 33.980 MHz and an output of 46.140 MHz is a same band repeater.

In same band repeaters, a central design problem is keeping the repeater's own transmitter from interfering with the receiver. Reducing the coupling between transmitter and input frequency receiver is called isolation.

==== Duplexer system ====

In same-band repeaters, isolation between transmitter and receiver can be created by using a single antenna and a device called a duplexer. The device is a tuned filter connected to the antenna. In this example, consider a type of device called a band-pass duplexer. It allows, or passes, a band, (or a narrow range,) of frequencies.

There are two legs to the duplexer filter, one is tuned to pass the input frequency, the other is tuned to pass the output frequency. Both legs of the filter are coupled to the antenna. The repeater receiver is connected to the receive leg while the transmitter is connected to the transmit leg. The duplexer prevents degradation of the receiver sensitivity by the transmitter in two ways. First, the receive leg greatly attenuates the transmitter's carrier at the receiver input (typically by 90-100 dB), preventing the carrier from overloading (blocking) the receiver front end. Second, the transmit leg attenuates the transmitter broadband noise on the receiver frequency, also typically by 90-100 dB. By virtue of the transmitter and receiver being on different frequencies, they can operate at the same time on a single antenna.

According to Bertrand, "Radio repeater stations nearly always use cavity filters." Their advantages include very high Q factor, and the ability to handle high power levels. These filters are cavity resonators. The cylinder provides inductance, and surrounds a capacitor with a tuning knob.

==== Combining system ====
There is often not enough tower space to accommodate a separate antenna for each repeater at crowded equipment sites. In same-band repeaters at engineered, shared equipment sites, repeaters can be connected to shared antenna systems. These are common in trunked systems, where up to 29 repeaters for a single trunked system may be located at the same site. (Some architectures such as iDEN sites may have more than 29 repeaters.)

In a shared system, a receive antenna is usually located at the top of the antenna tower. Putting the receive antenna at the top helps to capture weaker received signals than if the receive antenna were lower of the two. By splitting the received signal from the antenna, many receivers can work satisfactorily from a single antenna. Devices called receiver multicouplers split the signal from the antenna into many receiver connections. The multicoupler amplifies the signals reaching the antenna, then feeds them to several receivers, attempting to make up for losses in the power dividers (or splitters). These operate similarly to a cable TV splitter but must be built to higher quality standards so they work in environments where strong interfering signals are present.

On the transmitter side, a transmit antenna is installed somewhere below the receive antenna. There is an electrical relationship defined by the distance between transmit and receive antennas. A desirable null exists if the transmit antenna is located exactly below the receive antenna beyond a minimum distance. Almost the same isolation as a low-grade duplexer (about −60 decibels) can be accomplished by installing the transmit antenna below, and along the centerline of, the receive antenna. Several transmitters can be connected to the same antenna using filters called combiners. Transmitters usually have directional devices installed along with the filters that block any reflected power in the event the antenna malfunctions. The antenna must have a power rating that will handle the sum of energy of all connected transmitters at the same time.

Transmitter combining systems are lossy. As a rule of thumb, each leg of the combiner has a 50% (3 decibel) power loss. If two transmitters are connected to a single antenna through a combiner, half of their power will reach the combiner output. (This assumes everything is working properly.) If four transmitters are coupled to one antenna, a quarter of each transmitter's power will reach the output of the combining circuit. Part of this loss can be made up with increased antenna gain. Fifty watts of transmitter power to the antenna will make a received signal strength at a distant mobile radio that is almost identical to 100 watts.

In trunked systems with many channels, a site design may include several transmit antennas to reduce combining network losses. For example, a six-channel trunked system may have two transmit antennas with three transmitters connected to each of the two transmit antennas. Because small variations affect every antenna, each antenna will have a slightly different directional pattern. Each antenna will interact with the tower and other nearby antennas differently. If one were to measure received signal levels, this would cause a variation among channels on a single trunked system. Variations in signal strength among channels on one trunked system can also be caused by:

- failed parts in the combiner,
- characteristics of the design,
- loose connectors,
- bad cables,
- mistuned filters, or;
- incorrectly installed components.

==== Modern ====
Cross-band repeaters are sometimes a part of government trunked radio systems. If one community is on a trunked system and the neighboring community is on a conventional system, a talk group or agency-fleet-subfleet may be designated to communicate with the other community. In an example where the community is on 153.755 MHz, transmitting on the trunked system talk group would repeat on 153.755 MHz. Signals received by a base station on 153.755 MHz would go over the trunked system on an assigned talk group.

In conventional government systems, cross band repeaters are sometimes used to connect two agencies who use radio systems on different bands. For example, a fire department in Colorado was on a 46 MHz channel while a police department was on a 154 MHz channel, they built a cross-band repeater to allow communication between the two agencies.

If one of the systems is simplex, the repeater must have logic preventing transmitter keying in both directions at the same time. Voting comparators with a transmitter keying matrix are sometimes used to connect incompatible base stations.

==== Historic ====
In looking at records of old systems, examples of cross-band commercial systems were found in every U.S. radio service where regulations allowed them. In California, specific systems using cross-band repeaters have existed at least since the 1960s. Historic examples of cross-band systems include:

- Solano County Fire, (former Fire Radio Service): 46.240 input; 154.340 output. This system was dismantled in the 1980s and is now a same-band repeater.
- Mid-Valley Fire District, Fresno, (former Fire Radio Service): 46.140 input; 154.445 output. This system was dismantled in the 1980s and is now a same-band repeater.
- Santa Clara County Department of Parks and Recreation, (former Forestry Conservation Radio Service): 44.840 MHz input; 151.445 MHz output. This system was dismantled in the 1980s and is now a same-band repeater.
- State of California, Governor's Office of Emergency Services, Fire, (former Fire Radio Service): 33.980 MHz input; 154.160 MHz output.

In commercial systems, manufacturers stopped making cross band mobile radio equipment with acceptable specifications for public safety systems in the early 1980s. At the time, some systems were dismantled because new radio equipment was not available. Sporadic E ionospheric ducting can make the 46 MHz and below frequencies unworkable in summer.

==== As links ====
For decades, cross-band repeaters have been used as fixed links. The links can be used for remote control of base stations at distant sites or to send audio from a diversity (voting) receiver site back to the diversity combining system (voting comparator). Some legacy links occur in the US 150–170 MHz band. US Federal Communications Commission rule changes did not allow 150 MHz links after the 1970s. Newer links are more often seen on 72–76 MHz (Mid-band), 450–470 MHz interstitial channels, or 900 MHz links. These links, known as fixed stations in US licensing, typically connect an equipment site with a dispatching office.

==== Vehicular repeaters ====
Modern amateur radios sometimes include cross-band repeat capability native to the radio transceiver.

In commercial systems, cross-band repeaters are sometimes used in vehicular repeaters. For example, a 150 MHz hand held may communicate to a vehicle-mounted low-power transceiver. The low-power radio repeats transmissions from the portable over the vehicle's high power mobile radio, which has a much longer range. In these systems, the hand-held works so long as it is within range of the low power mobile repeater. The mobile radio is usually on a different band than the hand-held to reduce the chances of the mobile radio transmitter interfering with the transmission from the hand-held to the vehicle.

- Motorola, for example, marketed a vehicular repeater system called PAC*RT. It was available for use with 150 MHz or 450 MHz hand-helds and interfaced with some Motorola mobile radios.
- In the 1980s, General Electric Mobile Radio had a 463 MHz emergency medical services radio that featured a 453 MHz vehicular repeater link to a hand-held.

There is a difficult engineering problem with these systems. If you get two vehicle radios at the same location, some protocol has to be established so that one portable transmitting doesn't activate two or more mobile radio transmitters. Motorola uses a hierarchy system with PAC*RT, each repeater transmits a tone when it is turned on, so the last one on site that turns on is the one that gets used. This is so several of them are not on at once.

Vehicular repeaters are complex but can be less expensive than designing a system that covers a large area and works with the weak signal levels of hand-held radios. Some models of radio signals suggest that the transmitters of hand-held radios create received signals at the base station one to two orders of magnitude (10 to 20 decibels or 10 to 100 times) weaker than a mobile radio with a similar transmitter output power.

== Siting as part of system design ==
Radio repeaters are typically placed in locations which maximize their effectiveness for their intended purpose:

- "Low-level" repeaters are used for local communications, and are placed at low altitude to reduce interference with other users of the same radio frequencies. Low-level systems are used for areas as large as an entire city, or as small as a single building.
- "High-level" repeaters are placed on tall towers or mountaintops to maximize their area of coverage. With these systems, users with low-powered radios (such as hand-held "walkie-talkies") can communicate with each other over many miles.

== Community Repeater ==
Popular mainly in the UK, community based radio systems usually consist of a community radio repeater (similar to a ham repeater), for use by the community and businesses often used for Civic Events, Shopwatch, PubWatch, Neighborhood Watch and Community engagement. In larger towns, separate systems are typically used, separating commercial and community use. Whereas in smaller towns, single systems are typically used by the whole community.

== Particular forms of RF repeaters ==
- Broadcast relay station for broadcast television repeaters
- Microwave radio relay for microwave RF telecommunications repeaters
- Cellular repeater
- Wireless repeater for WiFi

== See also ==
- Signal strength in telecommunications

== External lists ==
- UHF CB Australia – UHF CB News, Information, Repeater Locations & Sales. UHF CB Australia Supporting and expanding the UHF CB network
