= Redpine Signals =

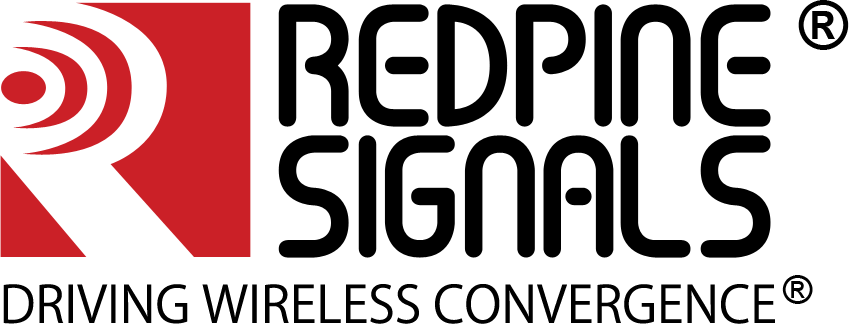
- Type: Private
- Industry: Semiconductor, Wireless, chipset
- Founded: 2001; 25 years ago
- Defunct: 2020; 6 years ago
- Fate: Acquired by Silicon Labs
- Headquarters: San Jose, California, United States
- Key people: Venkat Mattela, CEO
- Number of employees: 250 (04 June, 2018)
- Website: www.redpinesignals.com

Redpine Signals was a fabless semiconductor company founded in 2001. The company made chipsets and system-level products for wireless networks. It served the Internet of Things and wireless embedded systems market, enabling all volume levels of chipsets and modules.

In 2005, Redpine Signals developed a low power 802.11 b/g chipset, which it licensed to a semiconductor company for use in its product or SoC as a wireless interface. The company established a single stream 802.11n Wi-Fi product in 2007 for handheld devices. In 2012, Redpine Signals developed a simultaneous dual-band Wi-Fi 11n/BT 4.0 + 5 GHz MIMO 11ac convergence SoC for smartphones and tablets. The company also introduced a simultaneous dual-band 450 Mbit/s 3x3 802.11n chipset for digital home and enterprise applications.

In 2020, its connectivity business, including Wi-Fi and Bluetooth products, its development center in Hyderabad, and patent portfolio, was acquired by Silicon Labs.

== Products and services ==
Redpine Signals' products included single stream 802.11abgn chipsets and modules, and system products for Wi-Fi based Real-Time Locating Systems (RTLS). The company also offered 'Wi-Fi Starter Kits' that include Redpine Wi-Fi Interface cards integrated with microcontroller development kits from partnership companies.

In 2013, Redpine Signals launched a multiprotocol Wi-Fi, dual mode BT 4.0, and Zigbee chipset and modules for the IoT and handheld devices market.

There is an open-source device driver mainlined in the Linux kernel for some rsi91x hardware that uses the mac80211 framework. Other drivers are documented in Comparison of open-source wireless drivers.

The company offered a comprehensive Internet of Things IoT platform that includes hardware boards, application development environment, cloud software and services framework as well as a product synthesis solution for synthesizing the final product. The platform reduced the time it takes to develop and bring to market new IoT devices by providing integrated sensing, computing, communication, power management, cloud and application support.
