= Wireless repeater =

Wireless computer networking device

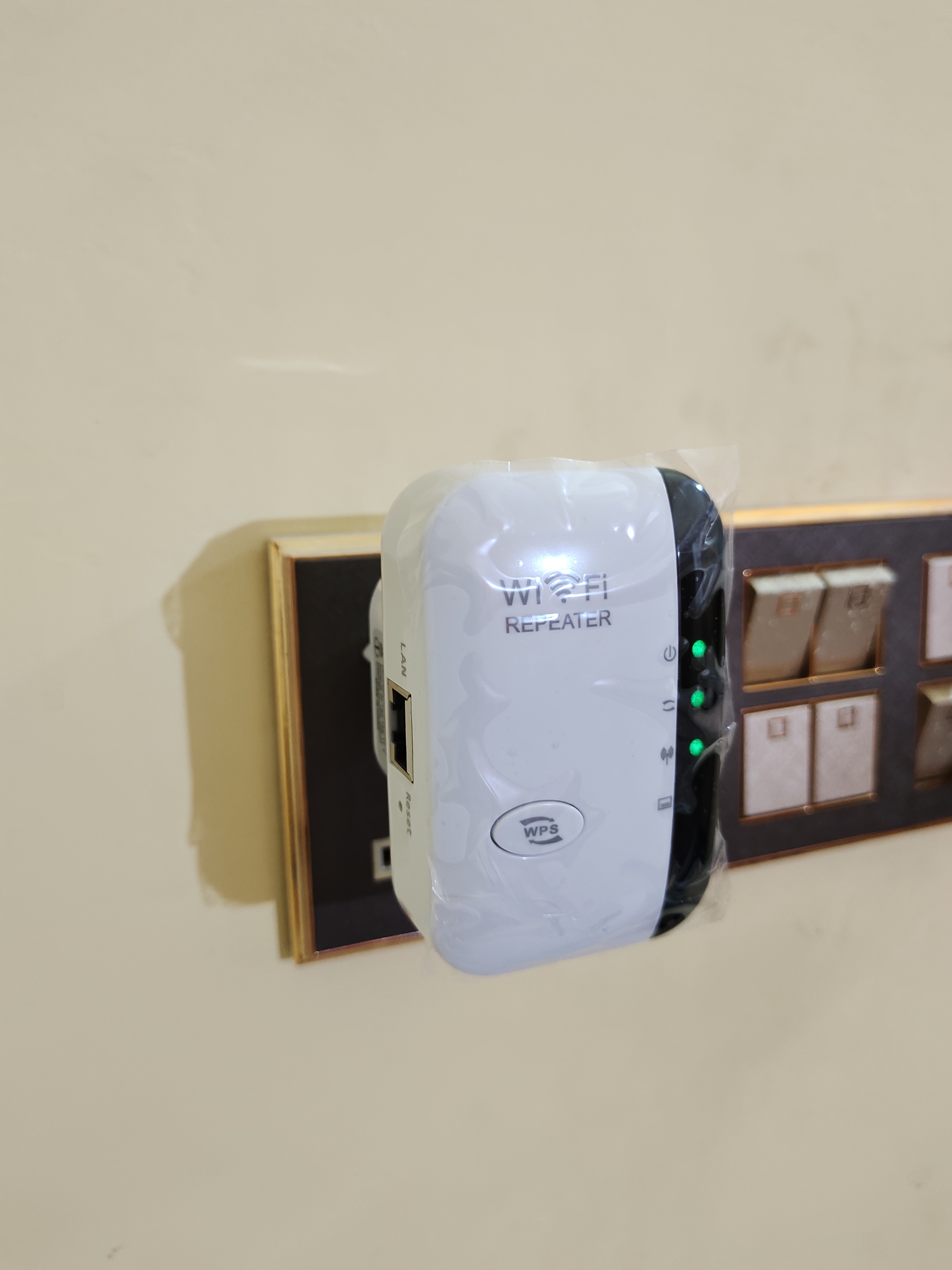
A Wi-Fi Repeater

A wireless repeater (also called wireless range extender or wifi extender) is a device that takes an existing signal from a wireless router or wireless access point and rebroadcasts it to create a second network. When two or more hosts have to be connected with one another over the IEEE 802.11 protocol and the distance is too long for a direct connection to be established, a wireless repeater is used to bridge the gap. It can be a specialized stand-alone computer networking device. Also, some wireless network interface controllers (WNIC)s optionally support operating in such a mode. Those outside of the primary network will be able to connect through the new "repeated" network. However, as far as the original router or access point is concerned, only the repeater MAC is connected, making it necessary to enable safety features on the wireless repeater. Wireless repeaters are commonly used to improve signal range and strength within homes and small offices.

== Uses ==
- When there is no wireless hotspot in an area
- In an area with much interference.
- Interference can be caused by many environmental factors such as microwaves (such as from a microwave oven), metal appliances or metallic coating or an impeded line of sight.
- When the distance between the computer and the wireless access point or wireless router is too great for the internal wireless network interface card to receive the wireless signal.
- When networking in an environment with interference and multiple computers, networks or hubs

== Drawbacks ==
Since only one wireless device can transmit at once, wireless transmissions are doubled (router to the repeater and then repeater to the client versus just router to the client), and so:

- Wireless throughput is reduced by at least 50%.
- Wireless interference (e.g., with other networks on the same channel) is at least doubled.
- Potentially opens another security attack vector. Older devices don't always support WPA2, so while the original network might be secure, the secondary one is potentially open.

Furthermore, the quality of the connection to an extender is generally worse than if connected to the host access point.

== Connectivity ==
Some wireless range extending devices connect via a USB port. These USB adapters add Wi-Fi capability to desktop PCs and other devices that have standard USB ports. USB supports not only the data transfers required for networking, but it also supplies a power source so that these adapters do not require electrical plugs. Some wireless repeaters have a power outlet. With those repeaters, you can still use your wall socket while using the repeater. Some wifi range extenders have an ethernet port to also provide a wired connection.

== Compatibility ==
There are wireless range extending devices that conform to all 802.11 protocols. Most 802.11 compliant devices are backward compatible. However, 802.11ac runs at 5 GHz and requires an access point capable of 5 GHz operation. 802.11ac equipment is backward compatible with 802.11n, 802.11g, or 802.11b equipment.

An older range extender will not be able to repeat the signal of a newer generation router. Security encryption compatibility also matters and must be at the same level of compatibility for the signal to be extended. For example, an older range extender that supports WEP and WPA will not be able to boost a WPA2-encrypted signal from a router.

== Alternatives ==
Most wireless repeaters (or range extenders) are purpose-built, but certain wireless routers can be flashed with custom firmware such as DD-WRT to give them a 'range extender' option.

A better option for extending wireless coverage is to configure a secondary box as a wireless access point, with a wired connection between a LAN port on this secondary box and a LAN port on the primary box (a router). If Ethernet wiring is not an option, an alternative is powerline networking. Wireless extender kits consisting of a powerline adapter module (connected to the wireless router) and a wireless extender module (integrated powerline networking and wireless access point) are available.

== See also ==
- hostapd
- Repeater
- Wireless distribution system
