= Shopwatch =

Type of crime prevention alliance

A typical Shopwatch notice sign
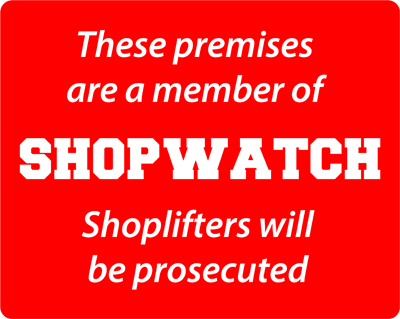
- This sign alerts potential thieves that the retail premises that displays this is a member of a Shopwatch scheme and operates increased security vigilance against shoplifting.

A Shopwatch scheme in the United Kingdom is a partnership where retailers unify as an independent group to pre-empt theft in retail premises. The Shopwatch organization works closely with local authorities and intends to reduce retail crime and antisocial behaviour and to help make shopping areas safer for customers and staff. Law enforcement supports the Shopwatch, as it works in concert with public safety campaigns, and retail crime reduction initiatives.

== Operations ==
Shopwatch schemes operate within city limits, towns, and villages across the UK. Customers to a retail premises that operates a Shopwatch scheme are informed of the operating Shopwatch scheme through the use of advertising media such as signs, posters and window stickers.

== Objectives of Shopwatch ==
- To tackle and prevent retail crime and anti-social behaviour through effective communication and the prompt reporting of retail crime, anti-social behaviour and criminal activity.
- To promote a sense of security for customers and staff.
- To improve police/licensee liaison by providing effective communications through Two-way radio (usually via a community radio repeater) and dedicated online services such as ShopwatchOnline.

== Shopwatch Schemes ==
Shopwatch schemes vary in size and are headed by a coordinator and meet as a group on a regular basis to discuss problems that have occurred on or near retail premises. Although Shopwatch schemes are supported by police who can offer help and advice, it must be recognised that the scheme is not run by police. Retailers that would like to set up a new Shopwatch scheme should contact their local police force.

== Shopwatch taking action ==
Shopwatch schemes may take action against individuals for Shoplifting in retail premises. This action may be in the form of a ban. The group will not tolerate behaviour such as verbal abuse, violence or theft. A vote to determine the action against these individuals is called at meetings. Action taken usually ranges from legal prosecution to 'banning orders' where the individual, for a set period of time, is not allowed to enter any of the retail areas and shopping malls containing the retail premises operated by the members of the Shopwatch group.

== Enforcement ==
The effectiveness of the Shopwatch initiative is mainly dependent on good communication and effective distribution of information. The preferred way of communication is by two-way radios that are available to each member. The police can be contacted directly on these radios. Individuals who are the subject of banning orders are identified by photographs that are circulated after action is taken against them. The photographs are normally circulated manually by police officers but digital circulation including mobile phone text messaging is being increasingly used by the schemes for improved efficiency.

== See also ==
- PubWatch
