= Tomo Razmilovic =

Swedish businessman

- Razmilovic, in 1994; with signature; as shown on a U.S. Postal Inspection Service wanted poster.
- Born: 31 May 1942 (age 84); Split, Yugoslavia (present-day Split, Croatia)
- Citizenship: Sweden
- Status: Indicted
- Criminal charges: Securities fraud, conspiracy to commit securities fraud
- Reward amount: US$100,000
- Capture status: Fugitive
- Wanted by: U.S. Postal Inspection Service
- Wanted since: 28 May 2004
- Time at large: 22 years

Tomo Razmilovic (born 31 May 1942) is a Croatian-born Swedish businessman, formerly the CEO of Long Island, New York-based Symbol Technologies. He is the suspected mastermind of a massive accounting fraud that ultimately cost the company its independence. Currently, the United States Government considers him a fugitive, with the United States Postal Inspection Service offering a $100,000 reward for information leading to his arrest and conviction.

Born in Split, Yugoslavia (present-day Split, Croatia), Razmilovic studied electrical engineering at the University of Zagreb and management at the Hammond Institute in Sweden. He obtained Swedish citizenship in 1971.

Razmilovic joined Symbol in 1989 as Senior Vice President of International Operations, becoming head of Worldwide Sales and Service in 1993 and president and chief operating officer in 1995. He succeeded founder Jerome Swartz as CEO in 2000. Previously, he had been president of International Computers Limited, a British computer manufacturer, and president and CEO of Cominvest, a Swedish computer company. He abruptly retired in 2002 in the midst of a Securities and Exchange Commission inquiry into its accounting practices.

On 28 May 2004 an arrest warrant for Razmilovic was issued by the United States District Court in Brooklyn. According to the United States Postal Inspection Service, he is wanted for orchestrating a massive accounting fraud that cost investors more than $200 million. He was formally indicted on 3 June along with seven other former Symbol executives. According to investigators, Razmilovic was the mastermind behind a wide-ranging scheme to inflate the company's sales and profits. It included several types of fraud, such as channel stuffing (booking sales to wholesalers and distributors as final sales to customers), candy deals (selling products to distributors with no matching customer orders and then buying the products back), use of tango sheets (records of how much revenues had to be inflated to match quarterly targets) and use of cookie jar reserves (declaring nonrecurring expenses that far exceeded likely expenses). On the same day, Razmilovic and 10 other executives were sued by the SEC for the fraud.

Eventually, four executives pleaded guilty, and seven executives settled SEC charges against them. Several of those who pleaded guilty stated under oath that Razmilovic was the mastermind of the fraud. After the fraud came to light, it was revealed that Razmilovic had been forced out at Cominvest due to accounting irregularities.

Symbol learned of the fraud in the summer of 2002 via an internal investigation, and cooperated with authorities. In late 2002, it restated almost four years worth of earnings from 1998 to 2001, in the process erasing $234 million in revenue and $325 million in net income. It also paid $37 million to settle the SEC charges and $138 million to settle numerous shareholder suits. The company never recovered, and was ultimately forced to merge with Motorola in 2007.

Razmilovic was not heard from again until 2004, when WNBC in New York City and Newsday, the main newspaper on Long Island, found him living in a small town in Sweden. He claimed to have fled to Sweden, where he holds citizenship, because he did not believe he would be able to get a fair trial in the United States. In 2008, Forbes magazine named Razmilovic one of the "World's Most Wanted White-Collar Fugitives".

The SEC won a default judgement against Razmilovic in 2009. In 2011, federal judge Sandra J. Feuerstein ordered Razmilovic to disgorge $41.7 million in illegal profits and pay a $20.8 million civil penalty. With interest, the penalty could add up to as much as $47 million. He is also banned from ever serving as an officer or director of a public company again. On 17 January 2014 federal prosecutors on Long Island filed a civil suit seeking the forfeiture of $12 million in illegal profits that they believe Razmilovic has hidden in a Credit Suisse account.

Razmilovic maintained his innocence. In a 2013 interview with WNBC and CNBC, he went as far as to demand an apology from investigators and media covering the story. He has stated that he has no intention of returning to the United States to face the charges against him. Sweden will not extradite Razmilovic because it does not extradite suspected white-collar criminals to countries outside the European Union. The accounting fraud was profiled by CNBC's American Greed: The Fugitives in 2013.

== See also ==
- List of fugitives from justice who disappeared
