= Wireless distribution system =

System enabling the wireless bridging of access points in an IEEE 802 network

A wireless distribution system (WDS) is a system enabling the wireless interconnection of access points in an IEEE 802.11 network. It allows a wireless network to be expanded using multiple access points without the traditional requirement for a wired backbone to link them. The notable advantage of WDS over other solutions is that it preserves the MAC addresses of client frames across links between access points.

An access point can be either a main, relay, or remote base station.

- A main base station is typically connected to the (wired) Ethernet.
- A relay base station relays data between remote base stations, wireless clients, or other relay stations; to either a main, or another relay base station.
- A remote base station accepts connections from wireless clients and passes them on to relay stations or to main stations. Connections between "clients" are made using MAC addresses.

All base stations in a wireless distribution system must be configured to use the same radio channel, method of encryption (none, WEP, WPA or WPA2) and the same encryption keys. They may be configured to different service set identifiers (SSIDs). WDS also requires every base station to be configured to forward to others in the system.

WDS may also be considered a repeater mode because it appears to bridge and accept wireless clients at the same time (unlike traditional bridging). However, with the repeater method, throughput is halved for all clients connected wirelessly. This is because Wi-Fi is an inherently half duplex medium and therefore any Wi-Fi device functioning as a repeater must use the Store and forward method of communication.

WDS may be incompatible between different products (even occasionally from the same vendor) since the IEEE 802.11-1999 standard does not define how to construct any such implementations or how stations interact to arrange for exchanging frames of this format. The IEEE 802.11-1999 standard merely defines the 4-address frame format that makes it possible.

== Technical ==
WDS may provide two modes of access point-to-access point (AP-to-AP) connectivity:

- Wireless bridging, in which WDS APs (AP-to-AP on local routers AP) communicate only with each other and don't allow wireless stations (STA, also known as wireless clients) to access them
- Wireless repeating, in which APs (WDS on local routers) communicate with each other and with wireless STAs

Two disadvantages to using WDS are:

- The maximum wireless effective throughput may be halved after the first retransmission (hop) being made. For example, in the case of two APs connected via WDS, and communication is made between a computer which is plugged into the Ethernet port of AP A and a laptop which is connected wirelessly to AP B. The throughput is halved, because AP B has to retransmit the information during the communication of the two sides. However, in the case of communications between a computer which is plugged into the Ethernet port of AP A and a computer which is plugged into the Ethernet port of AP B, the throughput is not halved since there is no need to retransmit the information. Dual band/radio APs may avoid this problem, by connecting to clients on one band/radio, and making a WDS network link with the other.
- Dynamically assigned and rotated encryption keys are usually not supported in a WDS connection. This means that dynamic Wi-Fi Protected Access (WPA) and other dynamic key assignment technology in most cases cannot be used, though WPA using pre-shared keys is possible. This is due to the lack of standardization in this field, which may be resolved with the upcoming 802.11s standard. As a result, only static WEP or WPA keys may be used in a WDS connection, including any STAs that associate to a WDS repeating AP.

OpenWRT, a universal third party router firmware, supports WDS with WPA-PSK, WPA2-PSK, WPA-PSK/WPA2-PSK Mixed-Mode encryption modes. Recent Apple base stations allow WDS with WPA, though in some cases firmware updates are required. Firmware for the Renasis SAP36g super access point and most third party firmware for the Linksys WRT54G(S)/GL support AES encryption using WPA2-PSK mixed-mode security, and TKIP encryption using WPA-PSK, while operating in WDS mode. However, this mode may not be compatible with other units running stock or alternative firmware.

== Example ==
Suppose one has a Wi-Fi-capable game console. This device needs to send one packet to a WAN host, and receive one packet in reply.

- Network 1: A wireless base station acting as a simple (non-WDS) wireless router. The packet leaves the game console, goes over-the-air to the router, which then transmits it across the WAN. One packet comes back, through the router, which transmits it wirelessly to the game console. Total packets sent over-the-air: 2.
- Network 2: Two wireless base stations employing WDS: WAN connects to the master base station. The master base station connects over-the-air to the remote base station. The Remote base station connects over-the-air to the game console. The game console sends one packet over-the-air to the remote base station, which forwards it over-the-air to the master base station, which forwards it to the WAN. The reply packet comes from the WAN to the master base station, over-the-air to the remote, and then over-the-air again to the game console. Total packets sent over-the-air: 4.
- Network 3: Two wireless base stations employing WDS, but this time the game console connects by Ethernet cable to the remote base station. One packet is sent from the game console over the Ethernet cable to the remote, from there by air to the master, and on to the WAN. Reply comes from WAN to master, over-the-air to remote, over cable to game console. Total packets sent over-the-air: 2.

Notice that network 1 (non-WDS) and network 3 (WDS) send the same number of packets over-the-air. The only slowdown is the potential halving due to the half-duplex nature of Wi-Fi.

Network 2 gets an additional halving because the remote base station uses double the air time because it is re-transmitting over-the-air packets that it has just received over-the-air. This is the halving that is usually attributed to WDS, but that halving only happens when the route through a base station uses over-the-air links on both sides of it. That does not always happen in a WDS, and can happen in non-WDS.

Important Note: This "double hop" (one wireless hop from the main station to the remote station, and a second hop from the remote station to the wireless client [game console]) is not necessarily twice as slow. End to end latency introduced here is in the "store and forward" delay associated with the remote station forwarding packets. In order to accurately identify the true latency contribution of relaying through a wireless remote station vs. simply increasing the broadcast power of the main station, more comprehensive tests specific to the environment would be required.

== See also ==
- Ad hoc wireless network
- Network bridge
- Wireless mesh network
