= Hostapd =

User space daemon software

hostapd (host access point daemon) is a user space daemon software enabling a network interface card to act as an access point and authentication server. There are three implementations: Jouni Malinen's hostapd, OpenBSD's hostapd and Devicescape's hostapd.

== Jouni Malinen's hostapd ==
Jouni Malinen's hostapd
- Developers: Jouni Malinen & others
- Stable release: 2.11 / 20 July 2024 (2 years ago)
- Operating system: Cross-platform
- Type: WLAN tools
- License: BSD
- Website: w1.fi/hostapd
- Repository: w1.fi/cgit/hostap/tree/hostapd

Jouni Malinen's hostapd is a user space daemon for access point and authentication servers. It can be used to create a wireless hotspot using a Linux computer. It implements IEEE 802.11 access point management, IEEE 802.1X/WPA/WPA2/EAP Authenticators, RADIUS client, EAP server, and RADIUS authentication server. The current version supports Linux (Host AP, MadWifi, Prism54 and some of the drivers which use the kernel's mac80211 subsystem), QNX, FreeBSD (net80211), and DragonFlyBSD.

== OpenBSD's hostapd ==
OpenBSD's hostapd
- Developer: Reyk Floeter
- Stable release: 3.9 / May 1, 2006
- Operating system: OpenBSD
- Type: WLAN tools
- License: BSD
- Website: OpenBSD's hostapd
- Repository: https://github.com/openbsd/src/tree/master/usr.sbin/hostapd

OpenBSD's hostapd is a user space daemon that improves roaming and monitoring of OpenBSD-based wireless networks. It implements Inter Access Point Protocol (IAPP) for exchanging station association information between access points. It can trigger a set of actions like frame injection or logging when receiving specified IEEE 802.11 frames.

== Devicescape's hostapd ==
Open Wireless Linux version of hostapd
- Developer: John Gordon
- Stable release: none yet / Date: N/A
- Operating system: Linux
- Type: WLAN tools
- License: GPL version 2
- Website: OWL hostapd
- Repository: Unknown

The Open Wireless Linux version of hostapd. It is kept as close as possible to the original open source release, but with OWL specific packaging and defaults. The website appears to be dead (April 2013), probably as the project itself.

== See also ==
- HostAP
