= Realtek =

Taiwanese semiconductor company

Realtek Semiconductor Corp.

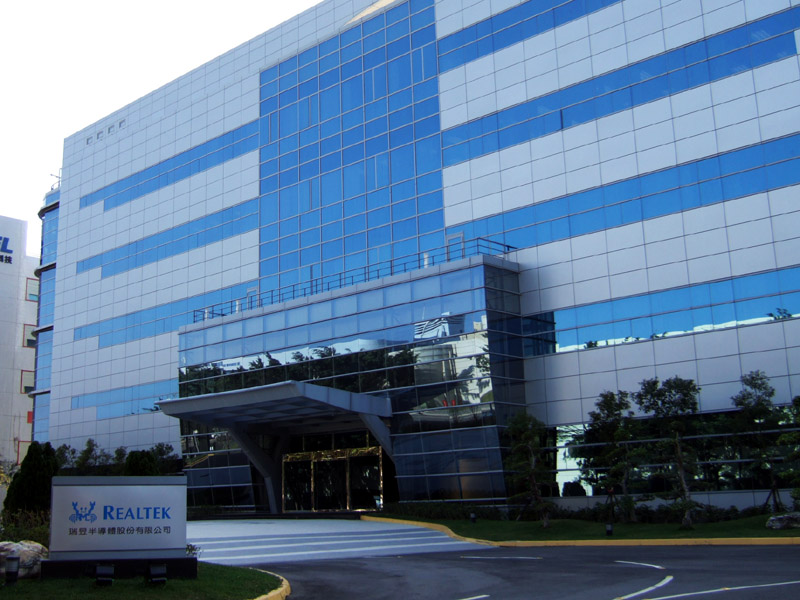
- Headquarters in Hsinchu Science Park
- Native name: 瑞昱半導體股份有限公司
- Type: Public
- Traded as: TWSE: 2379
- Industry: Semiconductor
- Founded: October 1987; 38 years ago
- Headquarters: Hsinchu Science Park, Hsinchu, Taiwan
- Key people: Sun-Chien Chiu (chairman); Kuang-Yu Yen (president)
- Products: Integrated circuit semiconductor chips
- Revenue: ▲NT$111.8 billion (2022)
- Operating income: ▼NT$15.72 billion (2022)
- Net income: ▼NT$16.21 billion (2022)
- Total assets: ▲NT$113.7 billion (2022)
- Total equity: ▲NT$46.76 billion (2022)
- Number of employees: 6,895 (2022)
- Website: www.realtek.com/en

Realtek
- Traditional Chinese: 瑞昱半導體
- Simplified Chinese: 瑞昱半导体
Transcriptions
Standard Mandarin
- Hanyu Pinyin: Ruìyù Bàndaǒtǐ

Realtek Semiconductor Corp. (Chinese: 瑞昱半導體股份有限公司; pinyin: Ruìyù Bàndǎotǐ Gǔfèn Yǒuxiàn Gōngsī) is a Taiwanese fabless semiconductor company situated in the Hsinchu Science Park, Hsinchu, Taiwan. Realtek was founded in October 1987 and subsequently listed on the Taiwan Stock Exchange in 1998. Realtek has manufactured and sold a variety of microchips globally. Its product lines broadly fall into three categories: communications network ICs, computer peripheral ICs, and multimedia ICs. As of 2019, Realtek employs 5,000 people, of whom 78% work in research and development.

== History ==
=== Avance Logic ===
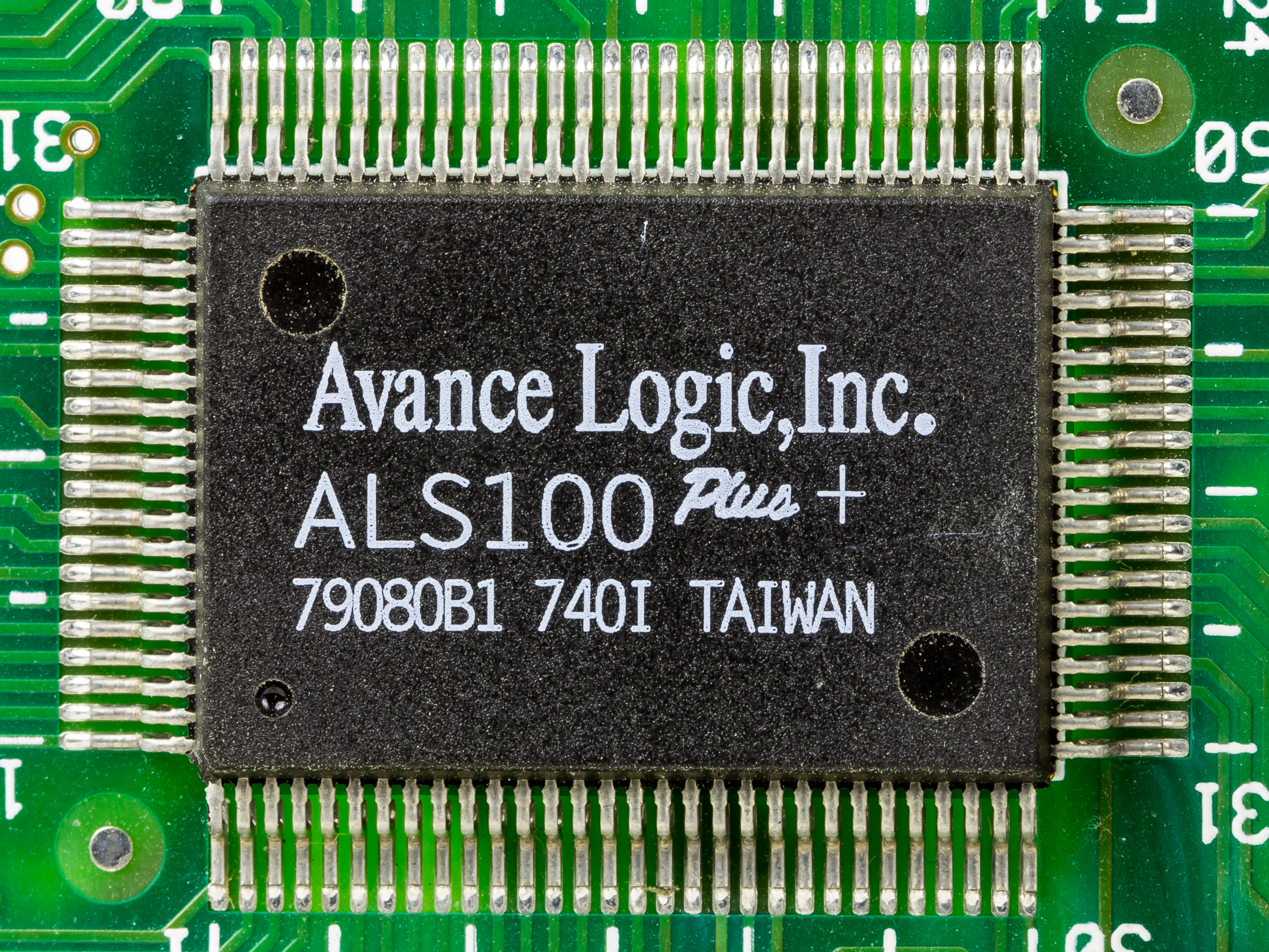
ALS 100 Audio Chip

Avance Logic, Inc. was a hardware manufacturer founded in 1991 in Fremont, California, and was most recently headquartered in San Jose, California. Avance Logic focused particularly on the development of low-cost, highly integrated electronic components for OEM manufacturers and was active in the areas of 2D graphics and audio. A 3D accelerator was developed in the mid-1990s, but it was not widely used. Avance Logic was acquired by Realtek as early as 1995 and was an independent subsidiary until the end of 2002, when the company was integrated into Realtek. Realtek's Audio Solutions are based on Avance Logic technology, which can also be recognized by the prefixes "ALG" (Avance Logic Graphics) and "ALS" (Avance Logic Sound).

== Products ==
Communication network IC products manufactured and marketed by Realtek include: network interface controllers (both traditional 10/100M and advanced gigabit Ethernet controllers), physical layer controllers (PHYceivers), network switch controllers, gateway controllers, wireless LAN ICs, as well as ADSL router controllers. In particular, the RTL8139 series 10/100M Fast Ethernet controllers reached their height during the late 1990s, and continued to take up a significant, and eventually predominant share in the worldwide market in the following years. Those devices categorized as Realtek's computer peripheral IC products consist of the traditional AC'97 audio codecs, the High Definition Audio codecs, card reader controllers, clock generators and IEEE 1394 ICs. Multimedia IC products include LCD Monitor Controllers, LCD TV Controllers and Digital Media Processors.

=== Driver support ===
The Realtek Downloads page provides drivers for a variety of operating systems, depending on the chipset, including for Windows, Mac and Linux.

=== Notable products ===
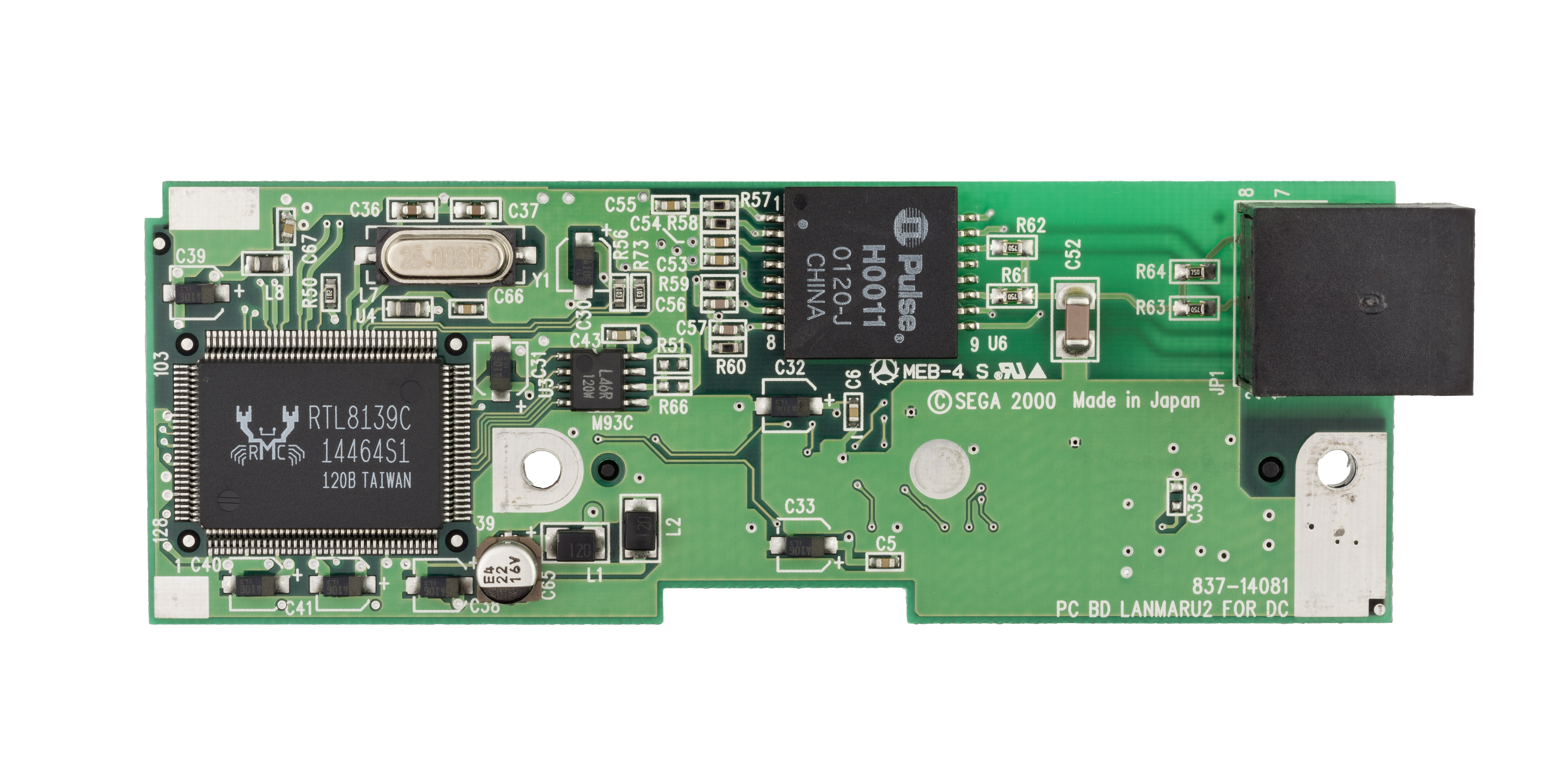
A RTL8139C chip as seen on a broadband adapter for a Sega Dreamcast video game console

Notable Realtek products include 10/100M Ethernet controllers (with a global market share of 70% as of 2003) and audio codecs (AC'97 and Intel HD Audio), where Realtek had a 50% market share in 2003 and a 60% market share in 2004, primarily concentrated in the integrated OEM on-board audio market-segment. As of 2013 the ALC892 HD Audio codec and RTL8111 Gigabit Ethernet chip have become particular OEM favorites, offering low prices and basic feature-sets. RTL8139-based NICs are dubbed "crab cards" (螃蟹卡) in Taiwan, alluding to the crab-like appearance of the Realtek logo.

=== Chipsets for HD multimedia players and recorders ===
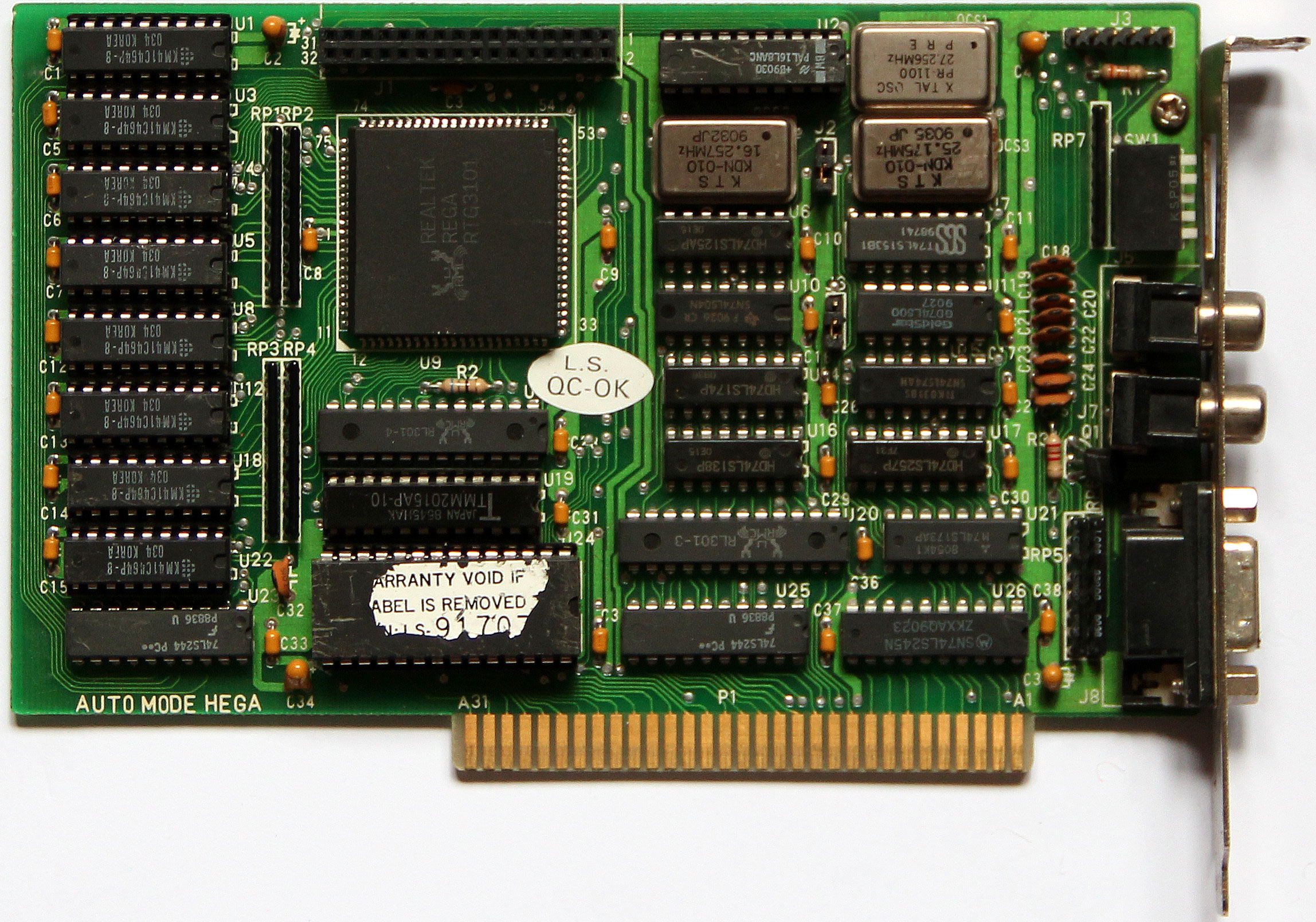
EGA graphic card with Realtek RTG3101

The increasing popularity of HD media players in 2009 led to the entry of Realtek into that market. The first series, the 1xx3 models (Note: For Realtek chipsets the last number in the chipset name indicates the chipset generation. So all chips ending in '3' are 1xx3 (2009) generation and all ending in '5' are 1xx5 (2011) generation.) sold at a lower price than similar quality chipsets of Realtek's competitors. (The main competitors were the Sigma Media Players.)

Realtek produced three major versions of Realtek 1xx3 and several minor variations. The three major 1xx3 chipset versions (1073, 1183, and 1283) all featured the same chip in terms of format support and performance, the only difference being the added ability to record AV sources in the 1283. HD Audio support in the 1xx3 improved through the chipset's life with several revisions. The DD and CC versions of the chipset both added full 7.1 HD-audio support to the chipset.

The 1073 players all built on a common SDK (firmware+OS) provided by Realtek. This meant that they were all essentially similar in performance and interface. It also meant that producing these players was very easy for manufacturers, all they had to do was create the hardware and Realtek provided the software.

Key players from the Realtek 1073 era were the original Xtreamer, the Asus O!PlayHD, ACRyan PlayOn and the Mede8er MED500X. Manufacturers released hundreds of Realtek 1073 players.

In early 2011 Realtek released series 1xx5, including the 1055, and 1185. These are the successors to the 1073 series. All three chips ran at 500 MHz which provided a small performance increase. Otherwise, the chips offered the same comprehensive format support as the previous generation. All chips ran the same Realtek SDK4 Casablanca, which offered improved user-experience (aesthetically, added media indexing, thumbnails...) from the stock SDK. As with the later version of the 1xx8 chipset, full 7.1 HD-audio downmix and passthrough are supported in the 1xx5.

Realtek released the next generation of its chipsets, the 1xx6 series 1186, in early October 2011. These ran at 750 MHz, supported HDMI 1.4, were capable of 3D including 3D ISO, and were able to dual-boot into Android. Key 1186 players include the Mede8er X3D Series (MED1000X3D, MED800X3D, MED600X3D), Xtreamer Prodigy 3D and HiMedia 900B.

== Security breach ==
According to the comprehensive analysis released by Symantec in 2011 regarding the Stuxnet virus, Realtek's digital certificate for Windows was compromised, allowing attackers to digitally sign malicious drivers without users being notified. The certificate was then revoked by Verisign: "The attackers would have needed to obtain the digital certificates from someone who may have physically entered the premises of the two companies (Realtek and JMicron) and stole them, as the two companies are in close physical proximity." states the report.

== See also ==
- List of companies of Taiwan
- Realtek Remote Control Protocol
