= HostAP =

IEEE 802.11 device driver for Linux

- Developer(s): Jouni Malinen & others
- Stable release: 0.6.9 / March 23, 2009
- Operating system: Linux
- Type: WLAN device drivers
- License: GPLv2
- Website: w1.fi

HostAP is a IEEE 802.11 device driver for Linux. It works with cards using the obsolete Conexant (formerly Intersil) Prism 2/2.5/3 chipset and supports Host AP mode, which allows a WLAN card to perform all the functions of a wireless access point.

The driver code was written by Jouni Malinen, hired by Atheros in 2008, and was included into the main kernel tree in Linux 2.6.14.

As of November 2016, HostAP is officially obsolete in the Linux kernel.

== See also ==
- Hostapd
- wpa supplicant
- Intel PRO/Wireless 2200BG AP Driver for Linux, an open source 802.11 b/g access point driver for the ipw2200 and ipw2915
