= Prism (chipset) =

The Prism brand is used for wireless networking integrated circuit (commonly called "chips") technology from Conexant for wireless LANs. They were formerly produced by Intersil Corporation, before being sold to GlobespanVirata in 2003, which was later acquired by Conexant in early 2004.

== Legacy 802.11b products (Prism 2/2.5/3) ==
The open-source HostAP driver supports the IEEE 802.11b Prism 2/2.5/3 family of chips.

Wireless adaptors which use the Prism chipset are known for compatibility, and are preferred for specialist applications such as packet capture.

No win64 drivers are known to exist.

=== Intersil firmware ===
- WEP
- WPA (TKIP), after update
- WPA2 (CCMP), after update
- Access Point mode

=== Lucent/Agere ===
- WEP
- WPA (TKIP in hardware)

== 802.11b/g products (Prism54, ISL38xx) ==
The chipset has undergone a major redesign for 802.11g compatibility and cost reduction, and newer "Prism54" chipsets are not compatible with their predecessors.

Intersil initially provided a Linux driver for the first Prism54 chips which implemented a large part of the 802.11 stack in the firmware. However, further cost reductions caused a new, lighter firmware to be designed and the amount of on-chip memory to shrink, making it impossible to run the older version of the firmware on the latest chips. In the meantime, the PRISM business was sold to Conexant, which never published or provided information about the newer firmware API that would enable a Linux driver to be written.

A lack of SoftMAC support in the Prime54 driver resulted in only being able to use FullMAC devices. However, a reverse engineering effort eventually made it possible to use the newer Prism54 chipsets under the Linux and BSD operating systems. This effort deprecated the Prism54 driver in the Linux kernel, and has been replaced by the p54 driver which supports both FullMAC and SoftMAC.

== See also ==
- HostAP driver for prism chipsets
