= Symbol Technologies =

American technology company

Symbol Technologies, Inc.
- Logo used through 2004
- Type: Public
- Traded as: NYSE: SBL S&P 500 component (until 2007)
- Industry: AIDC
- Founded: 1973
- Founder: Jerome Swartz; Shelley A. Harrison
- Defunct: 2007
- Fate: Acquired by Motorola Solutions
- Headquarters: Holtsville, New York, United States
- Products: Barcode readers, wireless networking, mobile computers, RFID
- Number of employees: 5400
- Website: symbol.com at the Wayback Machine (archived 2006-03-16)

Symbol Technologies, Inc., was an American manufacturer and supplier of mobile data capture and delivery equipment. The company specialized in barcode scanners, mobile computers, RFID systems and Wireless LAN infrastructure.

Symbol was acquired by Motorola in 2007. In 2014, the enterprise hardware division of Motorola Solutions containing the Symbol line of products was acquired by Zebra Technologies.

== History ==
=== Before 2000 ===
The company was co-founded in 1973 by Jerome Swartz and physicist Shelley A. Harrison, originally under the name Stony Brook Applied Research. At that time, the company focused on handheld laser-based scanning of bar codes. Under Swartz, the company marketed handheld laser barcode scanning devices. The company focused heavily on the retail industry and began to get involved in inventory management. These activities typically required people to scan items where they are stored and as such needed to be mobile. Symbol began to make small computers that could store data scanned to take inventory counts remotely and then upload the information gathered to a host system. This was the rationale for the September 1988 purchase of MSI Data Corporation, a mobile computer company headquartered in southern California, for $120 million.

The mobile computers being manufactured at the time relied on static memory (in this case SRAM) for execution space and general storage. SRAM was extremely expensive and the team determined that it would be an improvement to use a radio to allow the mobile computer to be untethered but connected to the host system. A thin client architecture was adopted in conjunction with a spread spectrum radio network.

The enterprise mobility management market was dominated by Symbol Technologies and Telxon, Inc. Most notably, these two companies serviced major retailers such as Wal-Mart, Kroger, Safeway, Federated and others.

A notable turning point occurred in 1994 with a competition for business at Kroger. Symbol Technologies and Telxon were operating radio networks in the 2.4 GHz ISM bands. IEEE 802.11 was not yet ratified, so Symbol and Telxon were free to define competing standards of communication at this frequency band. Symbol settled on frequency hopping as the most robust, agile and interference-tolerant approach to data communications while Telxon selected direct sequence technology which they felt afforded higher transfer speeds with adequate interference immunity. Kroger ordered a head-to-head comparison test. Ultimately and not decisively, Kroger chose Telxon. At about the same time, the IEEE decided to adopt the direct sequence approach in its IEEE 802.11b standard.

The ratification of IEEE 802.11b was a huge blow to the Symbol team which now had to reconfigure and engineer a direct sequence radio system. This was accomplished with great pains and IEEE 802.11b became a reality in the industrial and commercial markets far before the radios were available to the consumer market.

The addition of a radio to a mobile device was roughly estimated to have a real value of between $500 and $1000 per unit. This was paid by enterprise customers that desperately needed this feature to accomplish their operations.

Later on Symbol started to sell the radios as PC Cards as a stand-alone product to various original equipment manufacturers (OEMs) and private label customers. These included 3Com, Nokia and Intel.

The Symbol team had temporarily dominated the IEEE 802.11b market. Telxon was facing difficulties and, in the meantime, Intel, Apple Inc. and Cisco were looking at the technology to see how they would use this to their commercial advantage. Cisco investigated the acquisition of various manufacturers of wireless gear to augment its commanding position in the wired infrastructure field. Cisco performed due diligence with both Symbol and Telxon, deciding to purchase the Aironet component of Telxon that designed and manufactured the radios. The Cisco purchase of Telxon's Aironet division marked the inflection point of the market moving from a specialized, esoteric market to a mass consumer and enterprise market.

In June 1998, Telxon rejected a hostile takeover bid of $668 million made by Symbol. The ensuing proxy battle lasted two years, and in December 2000 Symbol was able to complete the takeover at a much lower price of $465 million.

In 2004 Symbol acquired Matrics, helping the company to push further into the RFID field.

=== Accounting fraud and acquisition by Motorola ===
Swartz retired in 2000, and was succeeded by Tomo Razmilovic, who had been president and COO since 1995. Razmilovic abruptly retired in 2002 during a Securities and Exchange Commission inquiry into Symbol's accounting practices. A few months later, an internal inquiry revealed a wide-ranging accounting fraud that had begun in 1998 and only ended in early 2002. Following this revelation, Symbol cooperated fully with the SEC investigation, as well as with a separate federal criminal probe by the United States Attorney for the Eastern District of New York.

On June 3, 2004, Razmilovic and seven other former Symbol executives were indicted on charges that they orchestrated a wide-ranging scheme to inflate the company's sales and profits. It included several types of fraud, such as channel stuffing (booking sales to wholesalers and distributors as final sales to customers), candy deals (selling products to distributors with no matching customer orders and then buying the products back), use of tango sheets (records of how much revenues had to be inflated to match quarterly targets) and use of cookie jar reserves (declaring nonrecurring expenses that far exceeded likely expenses). On the same day, Razmilovic and 10 other former executives were sued by the SEC for the fraud.

In late 2002, Symbol restated almost four years of earnings from 1998 to 2001, in the process erasing $234 million in revenue and $325 million in net income. It also paid $37 million to settle the SEC charges and $138 million to settle numerous shareholder suits. Eventually, four former executives pleaded guilty, and seven former executives settled SEC charges against them. Several of those who pleaded guilty stated under oath that Razmilovic was the mastermind of the fraud. Razmilovic fled to Sweden, where he has citizenship, shortly before his indictment. He remains a fugitive as of 2025; he claims he will not voluntarily return to face the charges against him because he does not believe he can get a fair trial in the United States. Sweden will not give him up for extradition because it does not extradite suspected white-collar criminals outside the European Union.

Logo used from 2004 to 2007

Symbol never recovered from the fraud, and in 2007 was acquired by Motorola for $3.9 billion. The company essentially took over Motorola's enterprise division; it was far larger than the pre-merger division. Symbol remained part of Motorola Solutions, the legal successor to the old Motorola, after the company spun off its mobile phone division as Motorola Mobility.

=== Acquisition by Zebra Technologies ===
In October 2014 Zebra Technologies acquired Motorola Solutions' enterprise business which included Symbol Technologies for $3.45 billion in cash.
