= Compound TCP =

TCP congestion avoidance algorithm for Windows Vista and Server 2008

Compound TCP (CTCP) is a Microsoft congestion control algorithm introduced in Windows Vista and Windows Server 2008 that remains supported in modern Windows operating systems like Windows 10 and 11 to optimize high-bandwidth, high-latency connections.

== Principles of operation ==
Like FAST TCP and TCP Vegas, Compound TCP uses estimates of queuing delay as a measure of congestion; if the queuing delay is small, it assumes that no links on its path are congested, and rapidly increases its rate. Unlike them, it does not seek to maintain a constant number of packets queued.

Compound TCP maintains two congestion windows: a regular AIMD window and a delay-based window. The size of the actual sliding window used is the sum of these two windows. The AIMD window is increased the same way that TCP Reno increases it. If the delay is small, the delay-based window increases rapidly to improve the utilisation of the network. Once queuing is experienced, the delay window gradually decreases to compensate for the increase in the AIMD window. The aim is to keep their sum approximately constant, at what the algorithm estimates is the path's bandwidth-delay product. In particular, when queuing is detected, the delay-based window is reduced by the estimated queue size to avoid the problem of "persistent congestion" reported for FAST and Vegas. Thus, unlike TCP-Illinois and its precursor TCP Africa, Compound TCP can reduce its window in response to delay. This increases its fairness to Reno.

Descriptions of Compound TCP can be found in a conference paper, an Internet-Draft, and a US patent.

== Windows 2003 and XP x64 ==
A hotfix is available that adds CTCP support to 64 bit Windows XP and Windows Server 2003.

The following registry key can be set to 1 to enable, or 0 to disable:

HKEY_LOCAL_MACHINE\SYSTEM\CurrentControlSet\Services\Tcpip\Parameters\TCPCongestionControl

== Windows Vista/2008/7 ==
CTCP is enabled by default in computers running beta versions of Windows Server 2008 and disabled by default in computers running Windows Vista and 7.

CTCP can be enabled with the command:

netsh interface tcp set global congestionprovider=ctcp 

or disabled with the command:

netsh interface tcp set global congestionprovider=none

To display the current setting for CTCP use:

netsh interface tcp show global

Parameter "Add-On Congestion Control Provider" will either have a value of "none" if CTCP is disabled or "ctcp" if it is enabled.

== Windows 8 and up ==
Since Windows 8, Windows uses PowerShell command Set-NetTCPSetting to modify the congestion control algorithm. Around 2018, Microsoft moved from CTCP to using CUBIC in Windows 10 and the Xbox, because it was seen as very delay sensitive and also worked poorly in data centre, where delay variation was an issue.

== Linux ==
CTCP was ported to Linux by Angelo P. Castellani. A patch derived from this was developed at Caltech, which included CTCP's TUning By Emulation (TUBE, and only released to researchers due to software patents. Since kernel version 2.6.17 the module has been incompatible and fails to compile due to kernel API changes.

== See also ==
- TCP congestion avoidance algorithm
- Explicit Congestion Notification
- Transmission Control Protocol — Development
