= Hamilton Institute =

Research centre at Maynooth University

- Parent institution: Maynooth University
- Established: 2001
- Director: Prof. Ken Duffy
- Location: Maynooth, Ireland
- Coordinates: 53.3849°N 6.6016°W
- Interactive map of Hamilton Institute
- Website: https://www.hamilton.ie/

The Hamilton Institute is a multi-disciplinary research centre at Maynooth University, named after William Rowan Hamilton, the Irish mathematician, astronomer, and physicist.

The Hamilton Institute was established in November 2001 under the first round of funding, by Science Foundation Ireland (SFI). It was officially opened by Bill Harris, SFI Director-General with the inaugural lecture being given by Kevin Warwick. Since 2001 the institute grew to a size to around 45 full-time researchers in 2008. From 2001 until 2014 the institute Director was Douglas Leith. From 2015 to 2016 Fiona Lyddy was acting director, with Ken Duffy serving as the Institute's director from 2016-2020. Since 2023, Andrew Parnell has been the director.

Since its founding, the institute has won a number of research grants, in addition to the original seed funding grant from SFI, including the €4.7M National Communications Network Research Centre, a €2.5M Systems Biology initiative, the €2.7M Next Generation Internet project, the National Biophotonics Platform and the €2.2M Network Mathematics initiative. The institute was also a partner in the €5.8M SFI funded FAME strategic research cluster announced in 2009. It hosts Maynooth University's students for the SFI Centre for Research Training in Data Analytics and Damien Wood's DNA computing group.

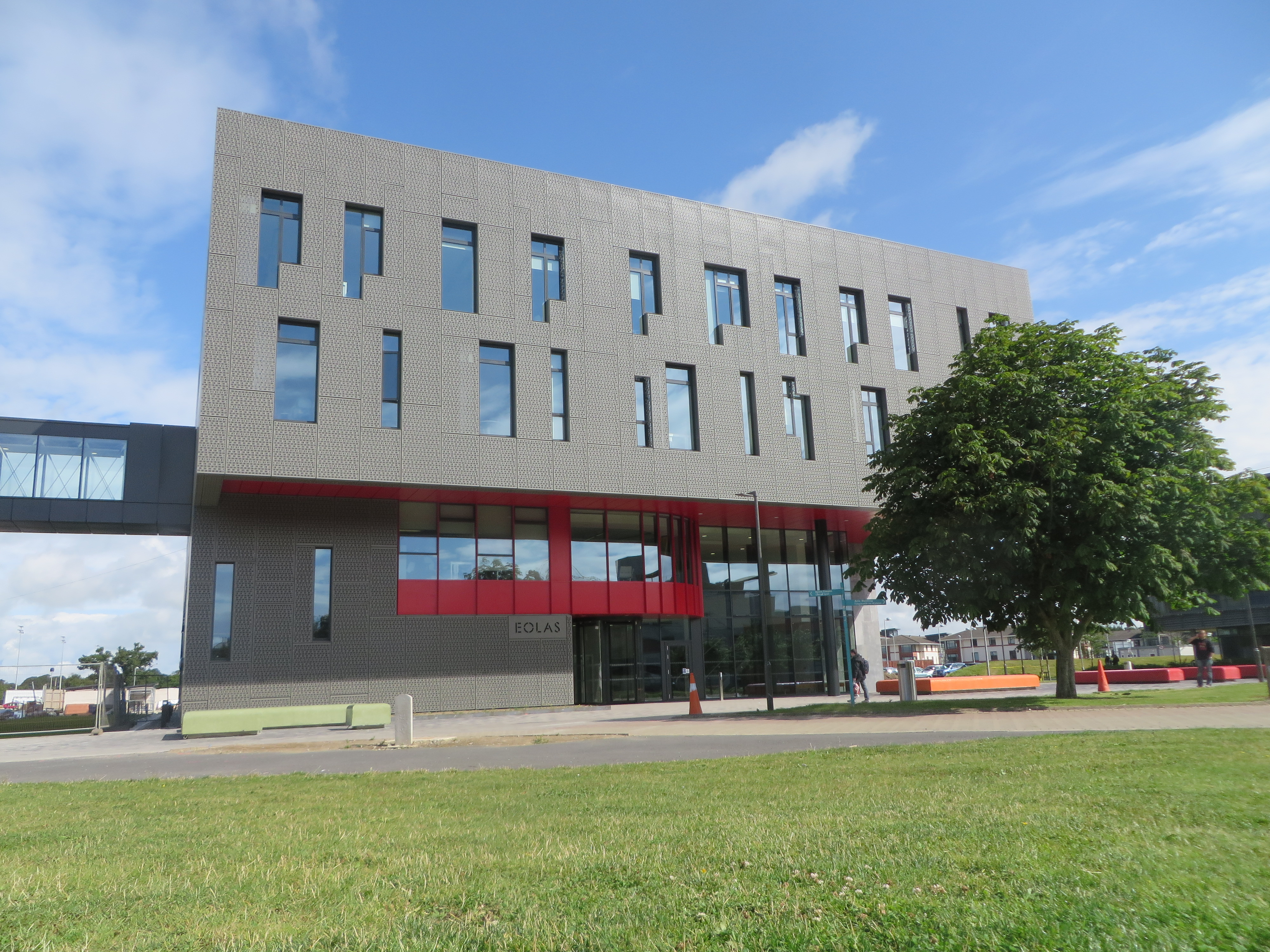
The Hamilton Institute is on the top floor of the EOLAS building

The Hamilton Institute's stated aim is to provide a bridge between mathematics and its applications in ICT and biology. It has organised a number of inter-disciplinary workshops including a series of biannual International Workshops on Non-negative Matrices & Their Applications, (run in 2004, 2006 and 2008) and a series of International Workshops on Systems Biology (in 2006 and 2008). The Hamilton Institute has also hosted workshops such as the International Symposium on Positive Systems (POSTA), the International Workshop on Multiple Access Communications (MACOM) and the Traffic Measurement and Analysis Conference.

The Hamilton Institute robotic soccer team were RoboCup World Champions in 2008, and have regularly fielded Robocup teams since.

== See also ==
- Computer networking, esp. transmission Control Protocol, H-TCP, IEEE 802.11
- Hybrid system, esp. stability theory and Lyapunov stability
- Systems biology
- Machine learning
- User interfaces for mobile phones
