= AIMD =

AIMD may refer to:

- Ab initio molecular dynamics
- Additive increase/multiplicative decrease
