= Transmission delay =

Time delay in networking caused by the data rate of a link

In a network based on packet switching, transmission delay (or store-and-forward delay, also known as packetization delay or serialization delay) is the amount of time required to push all the packet's bits into the wire. In other words, this is the delay caused by the data-rate of the link.

Transmission delay is a function of the packet's length and has nothing to do with the distance between the two nodes. This delay is proportional to the packet's length in bits. It is given by the following formula:

$D_T = N/R$ seconds

where:

$D_T$ is the transmission delay in seconds;
$N$ is the number of bits;
$R$ is the rate of transmission (say, in bits per second).

Most packet switched networks use store-and-forward transmission at the input of the link. A switch using store-and-forward transmission will receive (save) the entire packet to the buffer and check it for CRC errors or other problems before sending the first bit of the packet into the outbound link. Thus, store-and-forward packet switches introduce a store-and-forward delay at the input to each link along the packet's route.

== See also ==
- End-to-end delay

- Processing delay
- Queuing delay
- Propagation delay

- Network delay
- Round-trip delay
