= Goodput =

Application-level throughput of a network

In computer networks, goodput (a portmanteau of good and throughput) is the application-level throughput of a communication. In other words, goodput is the number of useful information bits delivered by the network to a certain destination per unit of time. The amount of data considered excludes protocol overhead bits as well as retransmitted data packets. This is related to the amount of time from the first bit of the first packet sent (or delivered) until the last bit of the last packet is delivered.

For example, if a file is transferred, the goodput that the user experiences corresponds to the file size in bits divided by the file transfer time. The goodput is always lower than the throughput (the gross bit rate that is transferred physically), which generally is lower than network access connection speed (the channel capacity or bandwidth).

Examples of factors that cause lower goodput than throughput include:

- Protocol overhead: Typically, transport layer, network layer and sometimes data link layer protocol overhead is included in the throughput, but is excluded from the goodput.
- Transport layer flow control and congestion avoidance: For example, TCP slow start may cause a lower goodput than the maximum throughput.
- Retransmission of lost or corrupt packets due to transport layer automatic repeat request (ARQ), caused by bit errors or packet dropping in congested switches and routers, is included in the data link layer or network layer throughput but not in the goodput.

== Example ==
For an application using the common Transmission Control Protocol (TCP) over IPv4 over Ethernet, the minimum protocol overhead consists of

- Ethernet physical layer: 20 bytes preamble, start frame delimiter and interpacket gap
- Ethernet data link layer: 18 bytes frame headers and frame check sequence
- IPv4 network layer: 20 bytes packet headers
- TCP transport layer: 20 bytes segment headers

for a total of 78 bytes: 38 bytes for Ethernet, and 40 bytes for IPv4 and TCP.

An IP packet over Ethernet may have a size of up to 1500 bytes – the maximum transmission unit for Ethernet. That means that a TCP segment can transport up 1500 - 40 = 1460 bytes, while Ethernet needs to transport 1500 + 38 = 1538 bytes. The overall efficiency is 1460 / 1538 = 94.9%. Accordingly, the maximum goodput for any application running over 100 Mbit/s Ethernet with TCP/IP is 94.9 Mbit/s or 11.9 MB/s. For Gigabit Ethernet, the same calculation results in 949 Mbit/s, or 119 MB/s.

When large objects or files (megabytes) are transmitted, the overhead of the application itself may be ignored since most protocols only add a single header of limited size for each object or file. When only small objects are transmitted, the overhead increases in proportion and becomes more significant.

== Data delivery time ==
The goodput is a ratio between delivered amount of information, and the total delivery time. This delivery time includes:

- Inter-packet time gaps caused by packet generation processing time (a source that does not use the full network capacity), or by protocol timing (for example collision avoidance)
- Data and overhead transmission delay (amount of data divided by bit rate)
- Propagation delay (distance divided by wave propagation speed)
- Packet queuing delay
- NAT translation delay
- Intermediate node store-and-forward processing delay
- Packet retransmission time (in case of deleted packets in congested routers, or detected bit errors)
- Delayed acknowledge due to flow control, congestion avoidance and processing delay

== See also ==
- Measuring network throughput
- Spectral efficiency

== Sources ==
- Energy-Efficient Power and Rate Control with QoS Constraints: A Game-Theoretic Approach
