= CTCP =

CTCP may refer to:

- California Tobacco Control Program, a branch in the California Department of Public Health (CDPH)
- Client-to-client protocol, a type of communication between Internet Relay Chat (IRC) clients
- Compound TCP, a Microsoft algorithm included in Windows Vista
- Composite toe and composite plate, a type of safety footwear
- Công ty cổ phần, a limited company in Vietnamese
- CTCP, the Jaipur Metro station code for Chhoti Chaupar metro station, Jaipur, Rajasthan, India
