= STCP =

STCP might be an acronym or abbreviation for:

- Sociedade de Transportes Colectivos do Porto (Porto Public Transport Society)
- Scalable Transmission Control Protocol
- Student Tax Clinic Program (USA)

See also

- Stream Control Transmission Protocol (SCTP)
