= Bruce Davie =

Australian computer scientist

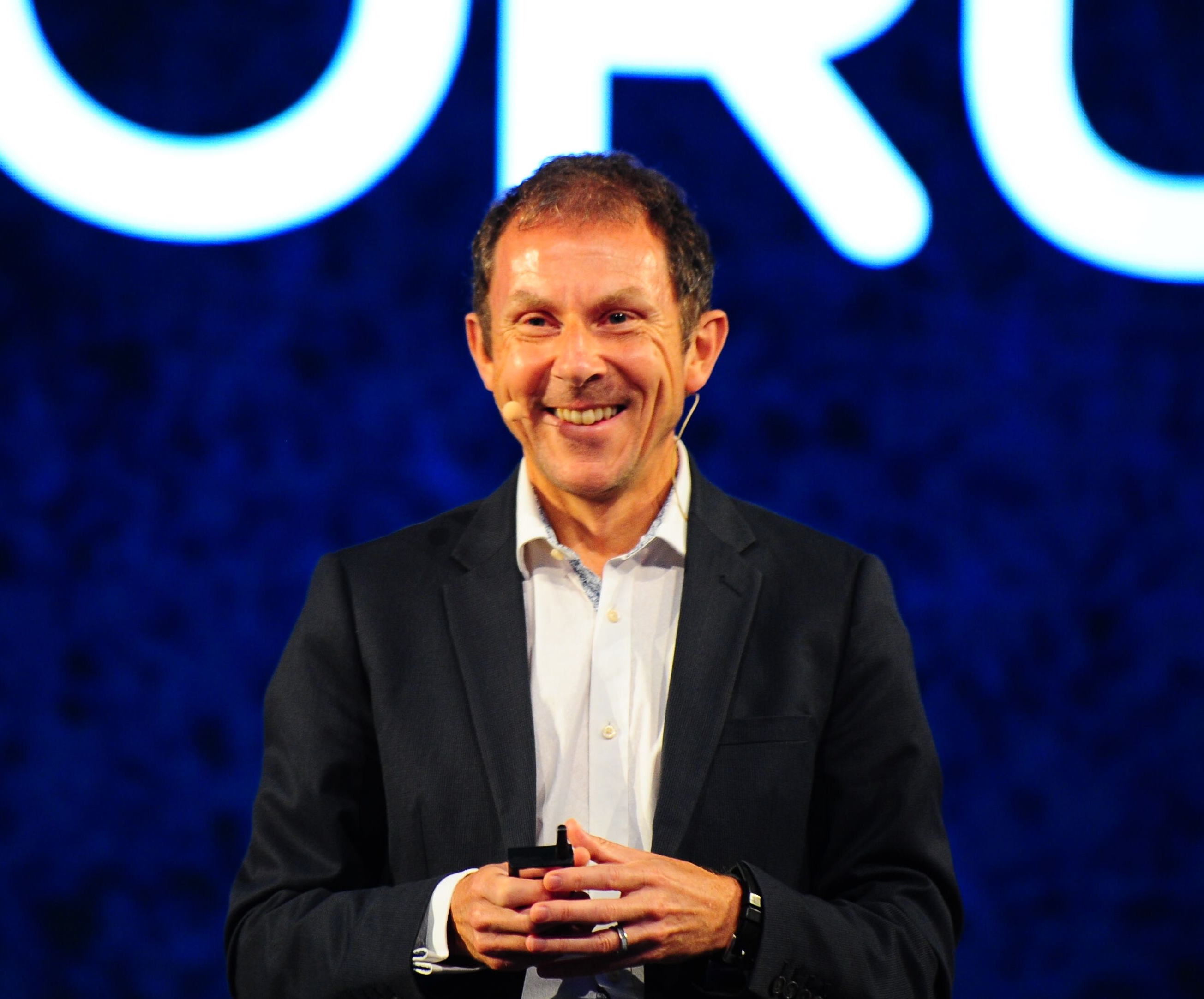
- Occupations: Former Chief Technology Officer for Asia Pacific and Japan, VMware
- Known for: Computer Networking
- Notable work: Computer Networks: A Systems Approach

Bruce Davie is a noted Australian computer scientist known for his work in the networking field. He has co-authored several textbooks, including (with Larry L Peterson) Computer Networks: A Systems Approach. Dr. Davie received his B.E. (Elec) from the University of Melbourne in 1984 and his Ph.D. from the University of Edinburgh in 1988.

He recently served as the Chief Technology Officer for Asia Pacific and Japan at VMware Inc. He joined VMware via the acquisition of software-defined networking (SDN) company Nicira, where he was Chief Service Provider Architect. Prior to Nicira, he was a Fellow at Cisco Systems, where he led the team of architects responsible for Multiprotocol Label Switching (MPLS).

From 1993 to 2012, he was an active participant in the Internet Engineering Task Force and co-authored 17 RFCs. He was a visiting lecturer at Massachusetts Institute of Technology from 2007 to 2011, and named as an ACM Fellow in 2009. From 2009 to 2013, he was the chair of ACM SIGCOMM. In 2013, he received an honorary doctorate from the University of Edinburgh. He is listed as co-inventor on over 40 U.S. Patents.

In 2021, he joined the advisory boards of bloXroute Labs, a blockchain scaling startup, and Intentionet, an SDN startup.

He has been active as a long-distance runner throughout his career, with a best marathon time of 2:46:51. He was also President of Greater Boston Track Club from 2004 to 2010.
