= Processing delay =

Time required for a router to process a packet header

In a network based on packet switching, processing delay is the time it takes routers to process the packet header. Processing delay is a key component in network delay.

During processing of a packet, routers may check for bit-level errors in the packet that occurred during transmission as well as determining where the packet's next destination is. Processing delays in high-speed routers are typically on the order of microseconds or less. After this nodal processing, the router directs the packet to the queue where further delay can happen (queuing delay).

In the past, the processing delay has been ignored as insignificant compared to the other forms of network delay. However, in some systems, the processing delay can be quite large especially where routers are performing complex encryption algorithms and examining or modifying packet content. Deep packet inspection done by some networks examine packet content for security, legal, or other reasons, which can cause very large delay and thus is only done at selected inspection points. Routers performing network address translation also have higher than normal processing delay because those routers need to examine and modify both incoming and outgoing packets.

== See also ==
- Latency (engineering)

== Bibliography ==
- Computer Networking: A Top-Down Approach by Kurose and Ross. 6th edition
