= Larry L. Peterson =

American computer scientist

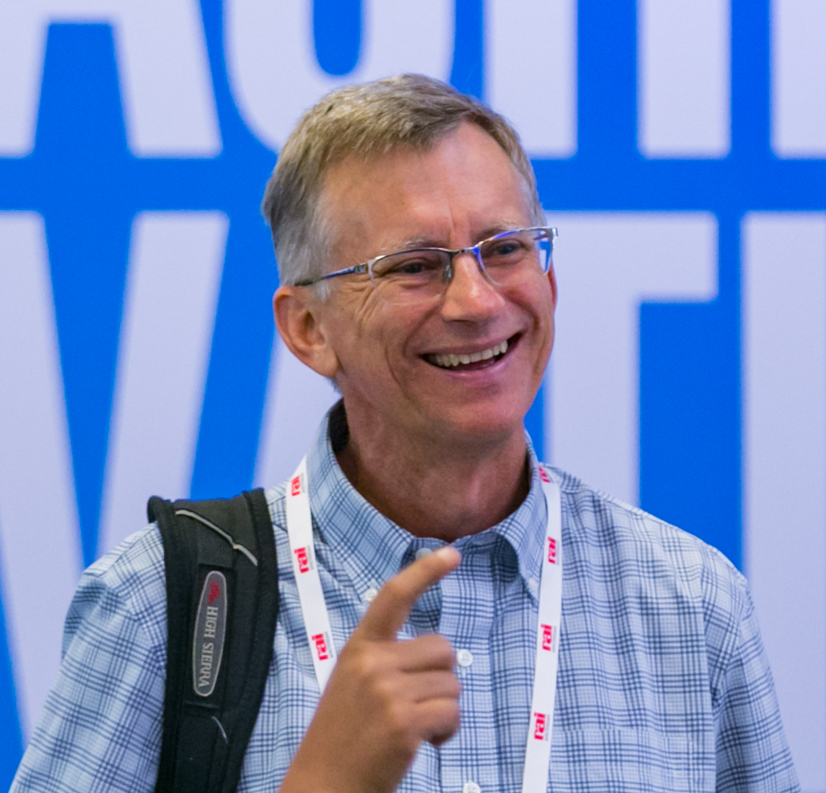
Peterson in 2018

Larry L. Peterson is an American computer scientist, known primarily as the Director of the PlanetLab Consortium, co-author (with Bruce Davie) of the networking textbook "Computer Networks: A Systems Approach," and for his research on the TCP Vegas congestion control algorithm and the x-kernel operating system.

Peterson received his B.S. in computer science from Kearney State College, Nebraska, in 1979, and M.S. and Ph.D. degrees in computer science from Purdue University in 1982 and 1985 under Douglas Comer, respectively. He then served as a professor at the University of Arizona, and later as the Robert E. Kahn Professor of Computer Science at Princeton University, where he also served as a department chair from 2003 to 2009. While at Princeton, he co-founded a startup to commercialize CDN technology developed on PlanetLab that was subsequently acquired by Akamai Technologies. He is now emeritus at Princeton University, and serves as CTO of the Open Networking Foundation.

Peterson was elected a member of the National Academy of Engineering in 2010 for contributions to the design, implementation, and deployment of networked software systems. He is also an ACM Fellow and a IEEE Fellow. He is also the recipient of the IEEE Kobayashi Award and the ACM SIGCOMM Award.
