= Sally Floyd =

American computer scientist (1950–2019)

- Born: May 20, 1950; Charlottesville, Virginia, U.S.
- Died: August 25, 2019 (aged 69); Berkeley, California, U.S.
- Education: University of California, Berkeley (BA, MS, PhD)
- Known for: Random early detection Explicit congestion notification Floyd Synchronization; Selective acknowledgement
- Spouse: Carole Leita (m. 2013)
- Awards: SIGCOMM Award
- Scientific career
- Fields: Computer science
- Thesis: On Space-Bounded Learning and the Vapnik-Chervonenkis Dimension (1989)
- Doctoral advisor: Richard M. Karp

Sally Jean Floyd (May 20, 1950 – August 25, 2019) was an American computer scientist known for her work on computer networking. Formerly associated with the International Computer Science Institute in Berkeley, California, she retired in 2009 and died in August 2019. She is best known for her work on Internet congestion control, and was in 2007 one of the top-ten most cited researchers in computer science.

== Biography ==
Born in Charlottesville, Virginia, Floyd received a B.A. in sociology from the University of California, Berkeley, in 1971. She received an M.S. in computer science in 1987 and a Ph.D. in 1989, both from UC Berkeley. Her Ph.D. was completed under the supervision of Richard M. Karp.

Floyd is best known in the field of congestion control as the inventor of Random Early Detection ("RED") active queue management scheme, thus founding the field of Active Queue Management (AQM) with Van Jacobson. Almost all Internet routers use RED or something developed from it to manage network congestion. Floyd devised the now-common method of adding delay jitter to message timers to avoid synchronization.

Floyd, with Vern Paxson, in 1997 identified the lack of knowledge of network topology as the major obstacle in understanding how the Internet works. This paper, "Why We Don't Know How to Simulate the Internet", was re-published as "Difficulties in Simulating the Internet" in 2001 and won the IEEE Communications Society's William R. Bennett Prize Paper Award.

Floyd is also a co-author on the standard for TCP Selective acknowledgement (SACK), Explicit Congestion Notification (ECN), the Datagram Congestion Control Protocol (DCCP) and TCP Friendly Rate Control (TFRC).

She received the IEEE Internet Award in 2005 and the ACM SIGCOMM Award in 2007 for her contributions to congestion control. She was involved in the Internet Architecture Board, and was in 2007 one of the top-ten most cited researchers in computer science.

== Awards ==
- 2007 - SIGCOMM Award from the ACM Special Interest Group on Data Communications. Recognized as most prestigious award to a scientist in computer networking.
- IEEE Communications Society's William R. Bennett Prize Paper Award for "Difficulties in Simulating the Internet", by Floyd and Vern Paxson

== Personal life and death ==
Floyd's father Edwin was a mathematician at the University of Virginia. Floyd was married to Carole Leita.

Floyd died at the age of 69 on August 25, 2019, in Berkeley, California, from gallbladder cancer that had metastasized.

== Selected notable papers ==
- S. Floyd and V. Jacobson, "Random Early Detection Gateways for Congestion Avoidance", IEEE/ACM Transactions on Networking (1993)
- S. Floyd and K. Fall, "Promoting the Use of End-to-End Congestion Control in the Internet", IEEE/ACM Transactions on Networking (1993)
- V. Paxson and S. Floyd, "Wide Area Traffic: The Failure of Poisson Modeling", IEEE/ACM Transactions on Networking (1995)
- M. Mathis, J. Mahdavi and S Floyd, A Romanow, "TCP Selective Acknowledgement Options", RFC 2018 (1996)
- S. Floyd and V. Paxson, "Why We Don't Know How to Simulate the Internet", Dec. 1997, Proceedings of the 1997 Winter Simulation Conference. Re-written as "Difficulties in Simulating the Internet", IEEE/ACM Transactions on Networking, vol. 9, no. 4 (August 2001). Winner of the IEEE Communications Society William R. Bennett Prize Paper Award, 2001.
