= L4S =

IETF network protocol

Low Latency, Low Loss, and Scalable Throughput
- Communication protocol
- OSI layer: Network layer / Transport layer
- IP number: IP (utilizes ECN codepoints), TCP, QUIC, UDP
- RFCs: 9330 (Architecture); 9331 (ECN Protocol); 9332 (Dual-Queue Coupled AQM)
- Hardware: Switches, Routers, and Cable Modems (Low Latency DOCSIS)

L4S (for Low Latency, Low Loss and Scalable Throughput) is an IETF network protocol and congestion control technology designed to simultaneously lower network latency and packet loss rates by reducing bufferbloat throughout the Internet, while preserving network throughput. It uses novel congestion control mechanisms to reduce queuing in the network.

L4S effectively introduces new rules for compliant endpoints and their traffic, giving L4S traffic preferential treatment in exchange for L4S endpoints cooperating by using improved congestion control algorithms. It has the remarkable property of not only improving performance for L4S traffic, but also improving performance for non-L4S traffic sharing the same infrastructure.

L4S has the advantage that it can start to provide incremental latency and throughput improvements through patchwork deployment by individual network operators without having to be adopted throughout the entire Internet, thus providing an incentive for early adopters.

== Details ==
L4S uses Explicit Congestion Notification (ECN) to transmit information about path latency problems, and allows congested nodes to use the ECN bits to send information back to senders that will allow them to adjust their transmit rate, reducing the need for data buffering within router queues.

L4S is specified in RFC 9330. It uses the last codepoint of the Internet Protocol header's ECN field that had not previously been assigned to signal that traffic is from an L4S-capable sender. The full set of four ECN codes for packets are thus:

Code	Meaning
00	Non-ECN-aware sender
01	L4S ECN-aware sender
10	Classic ECN-aware sender
11	Marked as congested

Routers can thus treat L4S traffic differently from non-L4S traffic, knowing that L4S endpoints can throttle back traffic in a more controlled way than would be possible using classic ECN. This is done by treating L4S traffic differently for both the cases of queuing and marking.

In an ideal world, L4S traffic would not need any network traffic policing, being entirely self-regulating. In practice. policing may be required to prevent attacks on infrastructure from mis-labeled traffic being introduced by non-compliant endpoints.

== Congestion control ==
The Prague requirements for transport protocol-level congestion control algorithms for L4S-enabled links were adapted from Data Center TCP, and are published in RFC 9331. They include requirements for non-disruptive coexistance with non-ECN-aware and non-L4S-aware classic ECN traffic. In 2026, researchers from Deakin and Columbia Universities, proposed AQM-LLM, a framework that distils large language models for L4S, integrating LLM-based decision making with the L4S architecture.

== Deployment ==
As of January 2025, Internet service providers had started to roll out L4S in their production networks, with Comcast being an early adopter. Apple have incorporated L4S support in their newer operating systems since 2023. Linux support for L4S, in the form of TCP Prague, is available on an experimental basis, and is expected to be merged into the main Linux kernel tree soon. FreeBSD support for L4S is available on an experimental basis.

In July 2025, T-Mobile announced support for L4S at a network level. In October 2025, Nokia and Vodafone were reported to have successfully tested L4S on a fibre-to-the-home system.

== See also ==
- TCP congestion control
