= CBQ =

CBQ may refer to:

- Catholic Biblical Quarterly, a refereed theological journal published by the Catholic Biblical Association of America
- CBQ-FM, a Canadian radio station, airing the Canadian Broadcasting Corporation's CBC Radio 2 network on 101.7 MHz at Thunder Bay, Ontario
- Chicago, Burlington and Quincy Railroad (reporting mark CBQ), was a Class I railroad that operated in the Midwestern United States
- Class based queueing, a queueing discipline for the network scheduler that allows traffic to share bandwidth equally, after being grouped by classes
