= Drop rate =

Drop rate may refer to:

- Drop rate (video gaming), the chance of obtaining a random item
- Packet drop rate, the rate at which packets are lost in a network connection
