= Jim Gettys =

American computer programmer

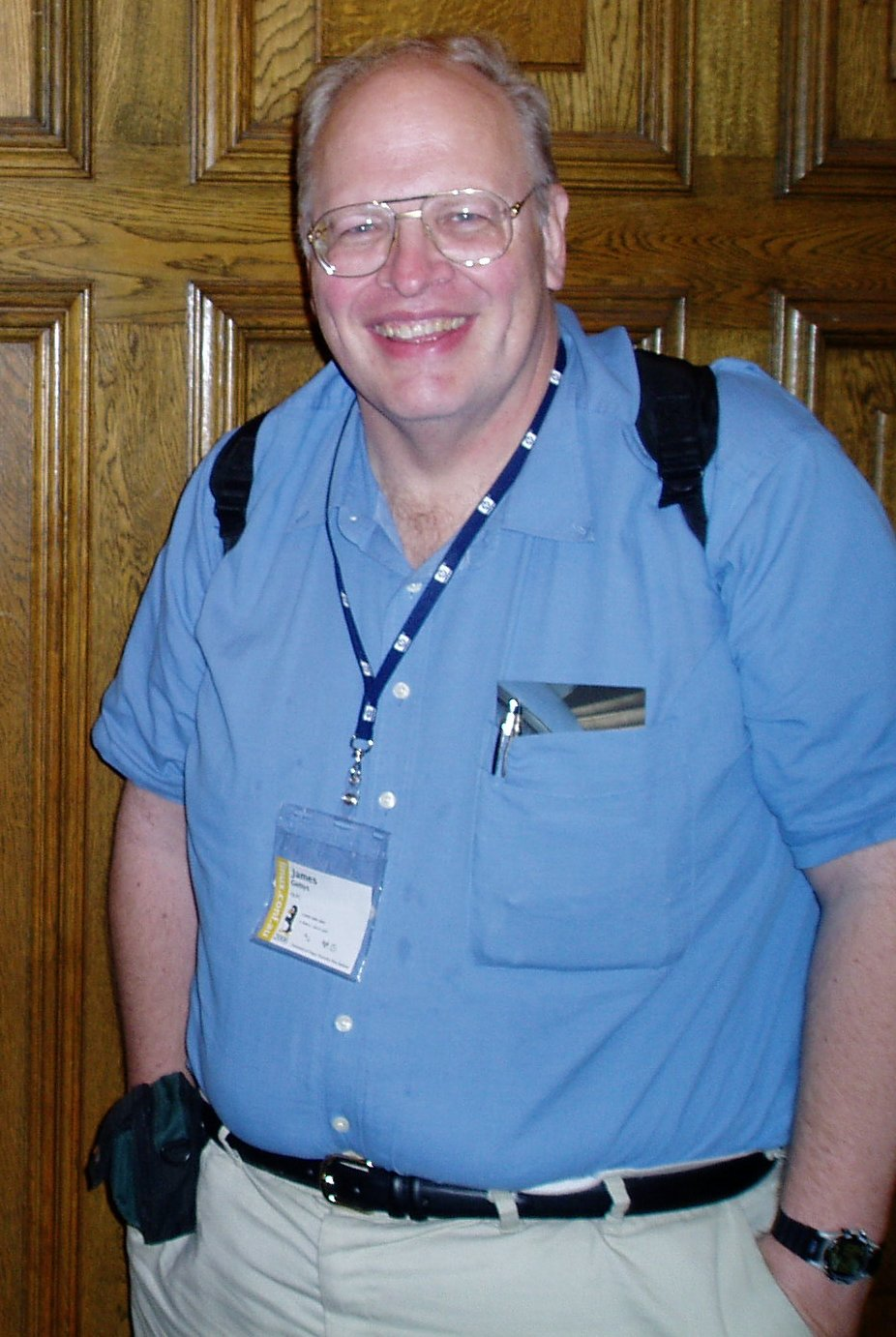
- Jim Gettys at linux.conf.au, January 2006.
- Born: October 15, 1953 (age 72)
- Education: Massachusetts Institute of Technology
- Occupation: Computer programmer

Jim Gettys (born 15 October 1953) is an American computer programmer.

== Activity ==
Gettys worked at DEC's Cambridge Research Laboratory.

He is one of the original developers of the X Window System at MIT and worked on it again with X.Org, where he served on the board of directors.

Until January 2009, he was the Vice President of Software at the One Laptop per Child project, working on the software for the OLPC XO-1.

From 2009 through 2014, he worked at Alcatel-Lucent Bell Labs.

Gettys was the co-founder of the group investigating bufferbloat and the effect it has on the performance of the Internet. He was a core member of the group from 2010 to 2017, concluding with his publication of "The Blind Man and the Elephant", calling for the wide adoption of fair queuing and active queue management techniques across the Internet, particularly RFC8290.

He served on the GNOME foundation board of directors.

He worked at the World Wide Web Consortium (W3C) and was the editor of the HTTP/1.1 specification in the Internet Engineering Task Force through draft standard.

Gettys helped establish the handhelds.org community, from which the development of Linux on handheld devices can be traced.

One of his main goals at OLPC was to review and overhaul much of standard Linux software, in order to make it run faster and consume less memory and power. In this context, he has pointed out a common fallacy among programmers today: that storing computed values in memory is preferable to recomputing those values later. This, he claims, is often false on current hardware, given fast CPUs and the long time it takes to recover from a potential cache miss.

He holds a BSc degree from MIT in Earth and Planetary Sciences (course 12 — EAPS).

== Awards ==
He won the 1997 Internet Plumber of the Year award on behalf of the group who worked on HTTP/1.1.

Gettys is one of the keepers of the Flame (USENIX's 1999 Lifetime Achievement Award) on behalf of The X Window System Community at Large.
