= Robust random early detection =

Robust random early detection (RRED) is a queueing discipline for a network scheduler. The existing random early detection (RED) algorithm and its variants are found vulnerable to emerging attacks, especially the Low-rate Denial-of-Service attacks (LDoS). Experiments have confirmed that the existing RED-like algorithms are notably vulnerable under LDoS attacks due to the oscillating TCP queue size caused by the attacks.

The Robust RED (RRED) algorithm was proposed to improve the TCP throughput against LDoS attacks. The basic idea behind the RRED is to detect and filter out attack packets before a normal RED algorithm is applied to incoming flows. RRED algorithm can significantly improve the performance of TCP under Low-rate denial-of-service attacks.

== The design of Robust RED (RRED) ==
A detection and filter block is added in front of a regular RED block on a router. The basic idea behind the RRED is to detect and filter out LDoS attack packets from incoming flows before they feed to the RED algorithm. How to distinguish an attacking packet from normal TCP packets is critical in the RRED design.

Within a benign TCP flow, the sender will delay sending new packets if loss is detected (e.g., a packet is dropped). Consequently, a packet is suspected to be an attacking packet if it is sent within a short-range after a packet is dropped. This is the basic idea of the detection algorithm of Robust RED (RRED).

== Algorithm of the Robust RED (RRED) ==
algorithm RRED-ENQUE(pkt)
01     f ← RRED-FLOWHASH(pkt) 
02     Tmax ← MAX(Flow[f].T1, T2)
03     if pkt.arrivaltime is within [Tmax, Tmax+T*] then
04         reduce local indicator by 1 for each bin corresponding to f
05     else
06         increase local indicator by 1 for each bin of f
07     Flow[f].I ← maximum of local indicators from bins of f 
08     if Flow[f].I ≥ 0 then
09         RED-ENQUE(pkt)  // pass pkt to the RED block
10         if RED drops pkt then
11             T2 ← pkt.arrivaltime
12     else
13         Flow[f].T1 ← pkt.arrivaltime
14         drop(pkt)
15     return

- f.T1 is the arrival time of the last packet from flow f that is dropped by the detection and filter block.
- T2 is the arrival time of the last packet from any flow that is dropped by the random early detection (RED) block.
- Tmax = max(f.T1, T2).
- T* is a short time period, which is empirically chosen to be 10 ms in a default RRED algorithm.

== The simulation code of the Robust RED (RRED) ==
The simulation code of the RRED algorithm is published as an active queue management and denial-of-service attack (AQM&DoS) simulation platform. The AQM&DoS Simulation Platform is able to simulate a variety of DoS attacks (Distributed DoS, Spoofing DoS, Low-rate DoS, etc.) and active queue management (AQM) algorithms (RED, RRED, SFB, etc.). It automatically calculates and records the average throughput of normal TCP flows before and after DoS attacks to facilitate the analysis of the impact of DoS attacks on normal TCP flows and AQM algorithms.
