= Tc (Linux) =

Linux user-space utility program

tc relates to the Linux kernel packet scheduler as iptables to netfilter. Both are user-space CLI programs that are used to configure their respective Linux kernel subsystem.

tc (traffic control) is the user-space system administration utility program used to configure the Linux kernel packet scheduler. tc is usually packaged as part of the iproute2 package.

== Syntax ==
tc filter add dev pppoe-dsl parent 1: prio 1 protocol ip handle 202 fw flowid 1:202

== See also ==
- cgroups
