= Blue (queue management algorithm) =

Blue is a scheduling discipline for the network scheduler developed by graduate student Wu-chang Feng for Professor Kang G. Shin at the University of Michigan and others at the Thomas J. Watson Research Center of IBM in 1999.

== Functioning ==
Like random early detection (RED), Blue operates by randomly dropping or marking packet with explicit congestion notification mark before the transmit buffer of the network interface controller overflows. Unlike RED, however, it requires little or no tuning to be performed by the network administrator. A Blue queue maintains a drop/mark probability p, and drops/marks packets with probability p as they enter the queue. Whenever the queue overflows, p is increased by a small constant p_{i}, and whenever the queue is empty, p is decreased by a constant p_{d} < p_{i}.

If the mix of traffic on the interface does not change, p will slowly converge to a value that keeps the queue within its bounds with full link utilization.

=== Stochastic fair Blue ===
The main flaw of Blue, which it shares with most single-queue queuing disciplines, is that it does not distinguish between traffic flows, but treats all flows as a single aggregate. Therefore, a single aggressive flow can push packets out of the queue belonging to other, better behaved, flows.

Stochastic fair Blue (SFB) is a stochastically fair variant of Blue which hashes flows and maintains a different mark/drop probability for each hash value. Assuming no hash collisions, SFB is able to provide a fair share of buffer space for every flow. In the presence of hash collisions, SFB is only stochastically fair.

Unlike other stochastically fair queuing disciplines, such as SFQ (Stochastic Fairness Queuing), SFB can be implemented using a bloom filter rather than a hash table, which dramatically reduces its storage requirements when the number of flows is large. When a flow's drop/mark probability reaches 1, the flow has been shown to not react to congestion indications from the network. Such an inelastic flow is put in a "penalty box", and rate-limited.

=== Resilient stochastic fair Blue ===
Many scheduling algorithms, including the fairness-aimed ones, are notably vulnerable to spoofing distributed denial-of-service (DDoS) attacks. A resilient stochastic fair Blue (RSFB) algorithm was proposed in 2009 against spoofing DDoS attacks. The basic idea behind RSFB is to record the responsive normal TCP flows and rescue their dropped packets. RSFB algorithm is effective in preserving the TCP throughput in the presence of spoofing DDoS attacks.

== Implementations ==
An implementation of Blue is part of ALTQ, the network scheduler for BSD Unix.

An implementation of SFB for Linux was included in the Linux kernel in version 2.6.39.
