= Hierarchical fair-service curve =

The hierarchical fair-service curve (HFSC) is a network scheduling algorithm for a network scheduler proposed by Ion Stoica, Hui Zhang, and T. S. Eugene from Carnegie Mellon University at SIGCOMM 1997

In this paper, we propose a scheduling algorithm that to the best of our knowledge is the first that can support simultaneously (a) hierarchical link-sharing service, (b) guaranteed real-time service with provable tight delay bounds, and (c) decoupled delay and bandwidth allocation (which subsumes priority scheduling). This is achieved by defining and incorporating fairness property, which is essential for link-sharing, into Service-Curve based schedulers, which can decouple the allocation of bandwidth and delay. We call the hierarchical version of the resulted algorithm a Hierarchical Fair Service Curve (H-FSC) Algorithm. We analyze the performance of H-FSC and present simulation results to demonstrate the advantages of H-FSC over previously proposed algorithms such as H-PFQ and CBQ. Preliminary experimental results based on a prototype implementation in NetBSD are also presented.

It is based on a QoS and CBQ. An implementation of HFSC is available in all operating systems based on the Linux kernel, such as e.g. OpenWrt, and also in DD-WRT, NetBSD 5.0, FreeBSD 8.0 and OpenBSD 4.6.
