= Kathleen Nichols =

American computer scientist and computer networking researcher

Kathleen Nichols is an American computer scientist and computer networking expert. Nichols is the founder and CEO of Pollere, Inc, a network architecture and performance company based in California, US. Before founding Pollere, Nichols was VP of Network Science at Packet Design, where she was part of the founding team. Prior to Packet Design she was director of advanced Internet architectures in the Office of CTO at Cisco Systems.

== Education and background ==
Nichols holds a Ph.D. in electrical engineering and computer sciences from University of California, Berkeley, and a B.S. in electrical engineering from the University of Pittsburgh. She has held several advanced architecture and research positions at Pollere, Cisco, Bay Networks, Com21, Philips Research Labs, Apple Computer, and AT&T Bell Labs. In addition, she was co-chair of the IETF Differentiated Services Working Group, has held several positions with the IEEE Hot Interconnects Symposium, and has been a guest editor of both IEEE Software and IEEE Micro.

== Research ==
Nichols' research focuses on networking and Internet performance. She has written about the problem of bufferbloat, which can lead to failure with Transmission Control Protocol congestion-avoidance algorithms. Bufferbloat causes problems such as high and variable latency, network bottlenecks, and dropped packets. As a buffer becomes full of packets for one TCP stream, packets from other network flows are dropped. The buffers then take some time to drain, before the TCP connection ramps back up to speed and then floods the buffers again. When the bufferbloat problem is present and the network is under load, even normal web page loads can take many seconds to complete, and simple DNS queries can fail due to timeouts.

Beyond bufferbloat, Nichols has also published additional research on how to control queueing delay, how to improve network simulation with feedback, and how to navigate complexity to achieve high performance. From September 1984 to December 1985, Nichols was an assistant professor of Electrical and Computer Engineering at Oregon State University.
