= Datagram Congestion Control Protocol =

Message-oriented transport layer protocol

- Communication protocol
- Abbreviation: DCCP
- Introduction
- OSI layer: Transport layer (4)
- RFC(s): 4340, 4336

In computer networking, the Datagram Congestion Control Protocol (DCCP) is a message-oriented transport layer protocol. DCCP implements reliable connection setup, teardown, Explicit Congestion Notification (ECN), congestion control, and feature negotiation. The IETF published DCCP as RFC 4340, a proposed standard, in March 2006. RFC 4336 provides an introduction.

== Operation ==
DCCP provides a way to gain access to congestion-control mechanisms without having to implement them at the application layer. It allows for flow-based semantics like in Transmission Control Protocol (TCP) but does not provide reliable in-order delivery. Sequenced delivery within multiple streams, as in the Stream Control Transmission Protocol (SCTP), is not available in DCCP. A DCCP connection contains acknowledgment traffic as well as data traffic. Acknowledgments inform a sender whether its packets have arrived, and whether they were marked by Explicit Congestion Notification (ECN). Acknowledgements are transmitted as reliably as the congestion control mechanism in use requires, possibly completely reliably.

DCCP has the option for very long (48-bit) sequence numbers corresponding to a packet ID, rather than a byte ID as in TCP. The long length of the sequence numbers aims to guard against "some blind attacks, such as the injection of DCCP-Resets into the connection".

== Applications ==
DCCP is useful for applications with timing constraints on the delivery of data. Such applications include streaming media, multiplayer online games and Internet telephony. In such applications, old messages quickly become useless, so that getting new messages is preferred to resending lost messages. As of 2017 such applications have often either settled for TCP or used User Datagram Protocol (UDP) and implemented their own congestion-control mechanisms, or have no congestion control at all. While being useful for these applications, DCCP can also serve as a general congestion-control mechanism for UDP-based applications, by adding, as needed, mechanisms for reliable or in-order delivery on top of UDP/DCCP. In this context, DCCP allows the use of different, but generally TCP-friendly, congestion-control mechanisms.

== Implementations ==
The following operating systems implement DCCP:

- FreeBSD, version 5.1 as patch
- Linux since version 2.6.14, but marked deprecated since version 6.4 due to lack of maintenance and scheduled for removal in 2025. Linux 6.16 drops DCCP.
  - DCCP was removed from Linux 6.16.

Userspace library:

- DCCP-TP implementation is optimized for portability, but has had no changes since June 2008.
- GoDCCP purpose of this implementation is to provide a standardized, portable NAT-friendly framework for peer-to-peer communications with flexible congestion control, depending on application.

== Packet structure ==
The DCCP generic header takes different forms depending on the value of X, the Extended Sequence Numbers bit. If X is one, the Sequence Number field is 48 bits long, and the generic header takes 16 bytes, as follows.

DCCP generic header (X = 1)
Offset	Octet	0								1								2								3							
Octet	Bit	0	1	2	3	4	5	6	7	8	9	10	11	12	13	14	15	16	17	18	19	20	21	22	23	24	25	26	27	28	29	30	31
0	0	Source Port																Destination Port															
4	32	Data Offset								CCVal				CsCov				Checksum															
8	64	Res			Type				X	Reserved								Sequence Number (high bits)↴															
12	96	↪Sequence Number																															

If X is zero, only the low 24 bits of the Sequence Number are transmitted, and the generic header is 12 bytes long.

DCCP generic header (X = 0)
Offset	Octet	0								1								2								3							
Octet	Bit	0	1	2	3	4	5	6	7	8	9	10	11	12	13	14	15	16	17	18	19	20	21	22	23	24	25	26	27	28	29	30	31
0	0	Source Port																Destination Port															
4	32	Data Offset								CCVal				CsCov				Checksum															
8	64	Res			Type				X	Sequence Number																							

Source Port: 16 bits
Identifies the sending port.
Destination Port: 16 bits
Identifies the receiving port.
Data Offset: 8 bits
The offset from the start of the packet's DCCP header to the start of its application data area, in 32-bit words.
CCVal: 4 bits
Used by the HC-Sender CCID.
Checksum Coverage (CsCov): 4 bits
Checksum Coverage determines the parts of the packet that are covered by the Checksum field.
Checksum: 16 bits
The Internet checksum of the packet's DCCP header (including options), a network-layer pseudoheader, and, depending on Checksum Coverage, all, some, or none of the application data.
Reserved (Res): 3 bits; Res == 0
Senders MUST set this field to all zeroes on generated packets, and receivers MUST ignore its value.
Type: 4 bits
The Type field specifies the type of the packet.
Extended Sequence Numbers (X): 1 bit
Set to one to indicate the use of an extended generic header with 48-bit Sequence and Acknowledgement Numbers.
Sequence Number: 48 or 24 bits
Identifies the packet uniquely in the sequence of all packets the source sent on this connection.

== Current development ==
Similarly to the extension of TCP protocol adding multipath capability (MPTCP), a multipath extension of DCCP is under discussion at the IETF, correspondingly denoted as MP-DCCP. First implementations have already been developed, tested, and presented in a collaborative approach between operators and academia and are available as an open source solution.

== See also ==
- Stream Control Transmission Protocol (SCTP)
- Transport layer § Comparison of transport layer protocols
