= Packet loss =

Transmitted packets failing to reach their destination

Packet loss occurs when one or more packets of data travelling across a computer network fail to reach their destination. Packet loss is either caused by errors in data transmission, typically across wireless networks, or network congestion. Packet loss is measured as a percentage of packets lost with respect to packets sent.

The Transmission Control Protocol (TCP) detects packet loss and performs retransmissions to ensure reliable messaging. Packet loss in a TCP connection is also used to avoid congestion and thus produces an intentionally reduced throughput for the connection.

In real-time applications like streaming media or online games, packet loss can affect a user's quality of experience (QoE).

== Causes ==
The Internet Protocol (IP) is designed according to the end-to-end principle as a best-effort delivery service, with the intention of keeping the logic routers must implement as simple as possible. If the network made reliable delivery guarantees on its own, that would require store and forward infrastructure, where each router devotes a significant amount of storage space to packets while it waits to verify that the next node properly received them. A reliable network would not be able to maintain its delivery guarantees in the event of a router failure. Reliability is also not needed for all applications. For example, with live streaming media, it is more important to deliver recent packets quickly than to ensure that stale packets are eventually delivered. An application or user may also decide to retry an operation that is taking a long time, in which case another set of packets will be added to the burden of delivering the original set. Such a network might also need a command and control protocol for congestion management, adding even more complexity.

To avoid all of these problems, the Internet Protocol allows for routers to simply drop packets if the router or a network segment is too busy to deliver the data in a timely fashion. This is not ideal for speedy and efficient transmission of data, and is not expected to happen in an uncongested network. Dropping of packets acts as an implicit signal that the network is congested, and may cause senders to reduce the amount of bandwidth consumed, or attempt to find another path. For example, using perceived packet loss as feedback to discover congestion, the Transmission Control Protocol (TCP) is designed so that excessive packet loss will cause the sender to throttle back and stop flooding the bottleneck point with data.

Packets may also be dropped if the IPv4 header checksum or the Ethernet frame check sequence indicates the packet has been corrupted. Packet loss can also be caused by a packet drop attack.

=== Wireless networks ===
Wireless networks are susceptible to a number of factors that can corrupt or lose packets in transit, such as radio frequency interference (RFI), radio signals that are too weak due to distance or multi-path fading, faulty networking hardware, or faulty network drivers.

Wi-Fi is inherently unreliable and even when two identical Wi-Fi receivers are placed within close proximity of each other, they do not exhibit similar patterns of packet loss, as one might expect.

Cellular networks can experience packet loss caused by, "high bit error rate (BER), unstable channel characteristics, and user mobility." TCP's intentional throttling behavior prevents wireless networks from performing near their theoretical potential transfer rates because unmodified TCP treats all dropped packets as if they were caused by network congestion, and so may throttle wireless networks even when they aren't actually congested.

=== Network congestion ===
Network congestion is a cause of packet loss that can affect all types of networks. When content arrives for a sustained period at a given router or network segment at a rate greater than it is possible to send through, there is no other option than to drop packets. If a single router or link is constraining the capacity of the complete travel path or of network travel in general, it is known as a bottleneck. In some cases, packets are intentionally dropped by routing routines, or through network dissuasion techniques for operational management purposes.

== Effects ==
Packet loss directly reduces throughput for a given sender as some sent data is never received and can't be counted as throughput. Packet loss indirectly reduces throughput as some transport layer protocols interpret loss as an indication of congestion and adjust their transmission rate to avoid congestive collapse.

When reliable delivery is necessary, packet loss increases latency due to additional time needed for retransmission. (Note: During typical network congestion, not all packets in a stream are dropped. This means that undropped packets will arrive with low latency compared to retransmitted packets, which arrive with high latency. Not only do the retransmitted packets have to travel part of the way twice, but the sender will not realize the packet has been dropped until it either fails to receive acknowledgement of receipt in the expected order or fails to receive acknowledgment for a long enough time that it assumes the packet has been dropped as opposed to merely delayed.) Assuming no retransmission, packets experiencing the worst delays might be preferentially dropped (depending on the queuing discipline used), resulting in lower latency overall.

== Measurement ==
Packet loss may be measured as frame loss rate, defined as the percentage of frames that should have been forwarded by a network but were not.

== Acceptable packet loss ==
Packet loss is closely associated with quality of service considerations. The amount of packet loss that is acceptable depends on the type of data being sent. For example, for voice over IP traffic, one commentator reckoned that "[m]issing one or two packets every now and then will not affect the quality of the conversation. Losses between 5% and 10% of the total packet stream will affect the quality significantly." Another described less than 1% packet loss as "good" for streaming audio or video, and 1–2.5% as "acceptable".

== Diagnosis ==
Packet loss is detected by reliable protocols such as TCP. Reliable protocols react to packet loss automatically, so when a person, such as a network administrator, needs to detect and diagnose packet loss, they typically use status information from network equipment or purpose-built tools.

The Internet Control Message Protocol provides an echo functionality, where a special packet is transmitted that always produces a reply. Tools such as ping, traceroute, MTR and PathPing use this protocol to provide a visual representation of the path packets are taking, and to measure packet loss at each hop. (Note: In some cases, these tools may indicate drops for packets that are terminating in a small number of hops, but not those making it to the destination. For example, routers may give echoing of ICMP packets low priority and drop them preferentially in favor of spending resources on genuine data; this is generally considered an artifact of testing and can be ignored in favor of end-to-end results.)

Many routers have status pages or logs, where the owner can find the number or percentage of packets dropped over a particular period.

== Packet recovery for reliable delivery ==
Per the end-to-end principle, the Internet Protocol leaves responsibility for packet recovery through the retransmission of dropped packets to the endpoints – the computers sending and receiving the data. They are in the best position to decide whether retransmission is necessary because the application sending the data should know whether a message is best retransmitted in whole or in part, whether or not the need to send the message has passed, and how to control the amount of bandwidth consumed to account for any congestion.

Network transport protocols such as TCP provide endpoints with an easy way to ensure reliable delivery of packets so that individual applications don't need to implement the logic for this themselves. In the event of packet loss, the receiver asks for retransmission or the sender automatically resends any segments that have not been acknowledged. Although TCP can recover from packet loss, retransmitting missing packets reduces the throughput of the connection as receivers wait for retransmissions and additional bandwidth is consumed by them. In certain variants of TCP, if a transmitted packet is lost, it will be re-sent along with every packet that had already been sent after it.

Protocols such as User Datagram Protocol (UDP) provide no recovery for lost packets. Applications that use UDP are expected to implement their own mechanisms for handling packet loss, if needed.

== Impact of queuing discipline ==
There are many queuing disciplines used for determining which packets to drop. Most basic networking equipment will use FIFO queuing for packets waiting to go through the bottleneck and they will drop the packet if the queue is full at the time the packet is received. This type of packet dropping is called tail drop. Other full queue mechanisms include random early detection and weighted random early detection. Dropping packets is undesirable, as the packet is either lost or must be retransmitted and this can impact real-time throughput; however, increasing the buffer size can lead to bufferbloat, which has its own impact on latency and jitter during congestion.

In cases where quality of service is rate limiting a connection, e.g., using a leaky bucket algorithm, packets may be intentionally dropped in order to slow down specific services to ensure available bandwidth for other services marked with higher importance. For this reason, packet loss is not necessarily an indication of poor connection reliability or signs of a bandwidth bottleneck.

== See also ==
- Bit slip
- Collision (telecommunications)
- Goodput
- Packet loss concealment
- Traffic shaping
