= Packet delay variation =

Difference of delay of packets in computer networking

In computer networking, packet delay variation (PDV) is the difference in end-to-end one-way delay between selected packets in a flow with any lost packets being ignored. The effect is sometimes referred to as packet jitter, although the definition is an imprecise fit.

== Terminology ==
The term PDV is defined in ITU-T Recommendation Y.1540, Internet protocol data communication service - IP packet transfer and availability performance parameters, section 6.2.

In computer networking, although not in electronics, usage of the term jitter may cause confusion. From RFC 3393 (section 1.1):

The variation in packet delay is sometimes called "jitter". This term, however, causes confusion because it is used in different ways by different groups of people. ... In this document we will avoid the term "jitter" whenever possible and stick to delay variation which is more precise.

== Measurement of packet delay variation ==
The means of packet selection for measurement is not specified in RFC 3393, but could, for example, be the packets that had the largest variation in delay in a selected time period.

The delay is specified from the start of the packet being transmitted at the source to the start of the packet being received at the destination. A component of the delay that does not vary from packet to packet can be ignored. If the packet sizes are the same and packets always take the same time to be processed at the destination, then the time the end of the packet is received could be used instead of the time the beginning is received.

Instantaneous packet delay variation is the difference between successive packets—here RFC 3393 does specify the selection criteria—and this is usually what is loosely termed jitter, although jitter is also sometimes the term used for the variance of the packet delay. As an example, say packets are transmitted every 20 ms. If the second packet is received 30 ms after the first packet, IPDV = +10 ms. This is referred to as dispersion. If the second packet is received 10 ms after the first packet, IPDV = −10 ms. This is referred to as clumping.

== PDV diagrams ==
It is also possible to visualize (I)PDV measurements, which makes interpreting and understanding the network easier, or (for bigger datasets) possible at all.

One possible diagram type is a simple point cloud diagram in which the x-axis represents the packet number and the y-axis contains the corresponding (I)PDV values, one dot for each measurement.

Another type is a distribution histogram, which is more useful for bigger datasets or even comparisons of different paths or technologies.

== Limiting PDV or its effects ==
The effects of PDV in multimedia streams can be mitigated by a properly sized buffer at the receiver. As long as the bandwidth can support the stream, and the buffer size is sufficient, buffering only causes a detectable delay before the start of media playback.

However, for interactive real-time applications, e.g., voice over IP (VoIP), PDV can be a serious issue and hence VoIP transmissions may need quality-of-service–enabled networks to provide a high-quality channel.

== See also ==
- Latency (engineering)
