= Weighted random early detection =

Network queueing discipline for congestion avoidance

Weighted random early detection (WRED) is a queueing discipline for a network scheduler suited for congestion avoidance. It is an extension to random early detection (RED) where a single queue may have several different sets of queue thresholds. Each threshold set is associated to a particular traffic class.

For example, a queue may have lower thresholds for lower-priority packets. A queue buildup will cause the lower-priority packets to be dropped, hence protecting the higher-priority packets in the same queue. In this way quality of service prioritization is made possible for important packets from a pool of packets using the same buffer.

It is more likely that standard traffic will be dropped instead of higher-priority traffic.

== Restrictions ==
On Cisco switches, WRED is restricted to

- TCP/IP traffic. Only this kind of traffic indicates congestion to the sender to enable a reduction of the transmission rate.

Non-IP traffic will be dropped more often than TCP/IP traffic because it is treated with the lowest possible precedence.

== Functional Description ==
WRED proceeds in this order when a packet arrives:

- Calculation of the average queue size.
- The arriving packet is queued immediately if the average queue size is below the minimum queue threshold.
- Depending on the packet drop probability, the packet is either dropped or queued if the average queue size is between the minimum and maximum queue thresholds.
- The packet is automatically dropped if the average queue size is greater than the maximum threshold.

=== Calculation of average queue size ===
The average queue size depends on the previous average as well as the current size of the queue. The calculation formula is given below:

$avg= o*(1-2^{-n}) + c*(2^{-n})\,\!$

where $n$ is the user-configurable exponential weight factor, $o$ is the old average and $c$ is the current queue size. The previous average is more important for high values of $n$. Peaks and lows in queue size are smoothed by a high value. For low values of $n$, the average queue size is close to the current queue size.
