= PEXQ =

PEXQ stands for a series of algorithms for the objective measuring of the perceived quality of communication channels and a software suite to use them. In particular the algorithms are

- Perceptual Evaluation of Audio Quality (PEAQ) for audio quality of e.g. lossy audio codecs,
- Perceptual Evaluation of Video Quality (PEVQ) for video algorithms,
- Perceptual Evaluation of Speech Quality (PESQ) for speech transmissions and
- Perceptual Evaluation of Data-Download Quality (PEDQ) for data transfers.
