= DataPoint, Inc =

Data center provider in Baltimore, Maryland, US

DataPoint, Inc is an American data center (colocation) and managed data network services provider, located in Baltimore, Maryland, United States. It is one of the largest cloud computing, network management, and Infrastructure as a Service (IaaS) companies in Maryland.

== History ==
DataPoint, Inc is the name adopted by ToadNet after it was acquired by Continental VisiNet Broadband in 2004. The company was founded in Severna Park, Maryland as Toad Computers in 1986 by two high school students, David Troy and Ray Mitchell. Toad Computers began as Maryland's only Atari computer dealership and largely worked through mail-order until Atari started requiring their vendors to have storefront facilities in 1988.

The small computer sales company expanded into the internet service provider market in 1995, when the first commercial providers started to gain traction linking customers to the World Wide Web. When the passage of the Telecommunications Act of 1996 allowed newer companies to compete with the large telephone carriers by buying up phone lines, Troy bought out his partner Mitchell and shut down Toad Computers, opening the new ToadNet.

ToadNet managed to survive the end of the dot-com bubble as one of the last independently owned dial-up service providers in the country. Seeing opportunity to offer high-speed services and expand its data center, in 2004 ToadNet was sold to Continental VisiNet Broadband for a reported $2.6 million. Afterward, the name was changed to DataPoint and was relocated from Severna Park to Baltimore, into a new state-of-the-art data center. As of 2011, DataPoint continues to operate out of Baltimore as a subsidiary of Norfolk, Virginia-based “super-regional” cloud computing company, Continental VisiNet Broadband (which is itself owned by the large media company, Landmark Media Enterprises).

== Products and services ==
DataPoint specializes as an Internet service provider and data center company, providing broadband access and managed services largely to Baltimore, Maryland area businesses. Additionally, the company currently offers customized network services, cloud computing, virtual networks, colocation, IaaS, and NuSec solutions (providing internet security and firewalls).
