= LLQ =

LLQ may refer to:

- Low Latency Queuing
- Left lower quadrant
- Monticello Municipal Airport (Arkansas)
- DNS long lived queries
