= PSPLab =

Audio research lab in Taiwan

The Perceptual Signal Processing Lab, or PSPLab, is an audio research lab of National Chiao Tung University. It is located in Hsinchu, Taiwan, and focuses on researching better perceptual signal processing techniques, particularly in regard to DSP, Perception, and Software.

Current areas of research in PSPLab include:

1. Multi Channel Audio Compression
  - MP3 codec, MPEG-2/4 AAC codec
  - Psychoacoustic model, Bit Allocation, Filterbank
  - Low-delay AAC codec
  - Perceptual Evaluation of Audio Quality (PEAQ)
  - MPEG Surround
2. Multi Channel Audio Effect Processing
  - Room Reverberation
  - Room Acoustics
3. Real-time DSP Programming/Optimization
  - Variant Platform Optimization
  - Fixed-Point DSP Programming
