= NBAR =

NBAR is an acronym that could refer to:

- Nadir BRDF-Adjusted Reflectance, a basis for spectral calibration of remotely sensed imagery
- Nonbinding allocation of responsibility
- Network Based Application Recognition, the mechanism used by some Cisco routers and switches to recognize a dataflow by inspecting some packets sent.
