= DSIS =

DSIS may refer to:

- Danish Security and Intelligence Service, the national security agency of Denmark
- Dato' Sultan Sharafuddin Idris Shah, a Malaysian honour
- Double stimulus impairment scale, for assessing video quality
