= Resource Reservation Protocol =

Computer network protocol

- Communication protocol
- Abbreviation: RSVP
- OSI layer: Transport layer / Network layer
- IP number: Runs directly over IPv4 / IPv6 (IP protocol 46)
- RFCs: 2205 (Functional Specification); 3209 (RSVP-TE Extensions); 2750 (Extensions for Policy Control)
- Hardware: Hosts and Routers

The Resource Reservation Protocol (RSVP) is a transport layer protocol designed to reserve resources across a network using the integrated services model. RSVP operates over IPv4 or IPv6 and provides receiver-initiated setup of resource reservations for multicast or unicast data flows. It does not transport application data but is similar to a control protocol, like Internet Control Message Protocol (ICMP) or Internet Group Management Protocol (IGMP). RSVP is described in RFC 2205. It is assigned the IP protocol number 46.

RSVP can be used by hosts and routers to request or deliver specific levels of quality of service (QoS) for application data streams. RSVP defines how applications place reservations and how they can relinquish the reserved resources once no longer required. RSVP operations will generally result in resources being reserved in each node along a path. RSVP is not a routing protocol but was designed to interoperate with current and future routing protocols.

In 2003, development effort was shifted from RSVP to RSVP-TE for teletraffic engineering. Next Steps in Signaling (NSIS) was a proposed replacement for RSVP.

== Main attributes ==
1. RSVP requests resources for simplex flows: a traffic stream in only one direction from sender to one or more receivers.
2. RSVP is not a routing protocol but works with current and future routing protocols.
3. RSVP is receiver oriented in that the receiver of a data flow initiates and maintains the resource reservation for that flow.
4. RSVP maintains soft state (the reservation at each node needs a periodic refresh) of the host and routers' resource reservations, hence supporting dynamic automatic adaptation to network changes.
5. RSVP provides several reservation styles (a set of reservation options) and allows for future styles to be added in protocol revisions to fit varied applications.
6. RSVP transports and maintains traffic and policy control parameters that are opaque to RSVP.

== History and related standards ==
The basic concepts of RSVP were originally proposed in 1993.

RSVP is described in a series of RFC documents from the IETF:

- RFC 2205: The version 1 functional specification was described in RFC 2205 (Sept. 1997) by IETF. Version 1 describes the interface to admission (traffic) control that is based "only" on resource availability. Later RFC2750 extended the admission control support.
- RFC 2210 defines the use of RSVP with controlled-load RFC 2211 and guaranteed RFC 2212 QoS control services. More details in Integrated Services. Also defines the usage and data format of the data objects (that carry resource reservation information) defined by RSVP in RFC 2205.
- RFC 2211 specifies the network element behavior required to deliver Controlled-Load services.
- RFC 2212 specifies the network element behavior required to deliver guaranteed QoS services.
- RFC 2750 describes a proposed extension for supporting generic policy based admission control in RSVP. The extension included a specification of policy objects and a description on handling policy events. (January 2000).
- RFC 3209, "RSVP-TE: Extensions to RSVP for LSP Tunnels" (December 2001).
- RFC 3473, "Generalized Multi-Protocol Label Switching (GMPLS) Signaling Resource ReserVation Protocol-Traffic Engineering (RSVP-TE) Extensions" (January 2003).
- RFC 3936, "Procedures for Modifying the Resource reSerVation Protocol (RSVP)" (October 2004), describes current best practices and specifies procedures for modifying RSVP.
- RFC 4495, "A Resource Reservation Protocol (RSVP) Extension for the Reduction of Bandwidth of a Reservation Flow" (May 2006), extends RSVP to enable the bandwidth of an existing reservation to be reduced instead of tearing down the reservation.
- RFC 4558, "Node-ID Based Resource Reservation Protocol (RSVP) Hello: A Clarification Statement" (June 2006).

== Key concepts ==
The two key concepts of RSVP reservation model are flowspec and filterspec.

=== Flowspec ===
RSVP reserves resources for a flow. A flow is identified by the destination address, the protocol identifier, and, optionally, the destination port. In Multiprotocol Label Switching (MPLS), a flow is defined as a label-switched path (LSP). For each flow, RSVP also identifies the particular quality of service (QoS) required by the flow. This QoS information is called a flowspec and RSVP passes the flowspec from the application to the hosts and routers along the path. Those systems then analyse the flowspec to accept and reserve the resources. A flowspec consists of:

1. Service class
2. Reservation spec - defines the QoS
3. Traffic spec - describes the data flow

=== Filterspec ===
The filterspec defines the set of packets that shall be affected by a flowspec (i.e., the data packets to receive the QoS defined by the flowspec). A filterspec typically selects a subset of all the packets processed by a node. The selection can depend on any attribute of a packet (e.g., the sender IP address and port).

The currently defined RSVP reservation styles are:

1. Fixed filter - reserves resources for a specific flow.
2. Shared explicit - reserves resources for several flows and all share the resources
3. Wildcard filter - reserves resources for a general type of flow without specifying the flow; all flows share the resources

An RSVP reservation request consists of a flowspec and a filterspec and the pair is called a flowdescriptor. The flowspec sets the parameters of the packet scheduler at a node and the filterspec sets the parameters at the packet classifier.

== Messages ==
There are two primary types of messages:

- Path messages (path)

The path message is sent from the sender host along the data path and stores the path state in each node along the path.
The path state includes the IP address of the previous node, and some data objects:

1. sender template to describe the format of the sender data in the form of a Filterspec
2. sender tspec to describe the traffic characteristics of the data flow
3. adspec that carries advertising data (see RFC 2210 for more details).

- Reservation messages (resv)

The resv message is sent from the receiver to the sender host along the reverse data path. At each node the IP destination address of the resv message will change to the address of the next node on the reverse path and the IP source address to the address of the previous node address on the reverse path.
The resv message includes the flowspec data object that identifies the resources that the flow needs.

The data objects on RSVP messages can be transmitted in any order. For the complete list of RSVP messages and data objects, see RFC 2205.

== Operation ==
An RSVP host that needs to send a data flow with specific QoS will transmit an RSVP path message every 30 seconds that will travel along the unicast or multicast routes pre-established by the working routing protocol. If the path message arrives at a router that does not understand RSVP, that router forwards the message without interpreting the contents of the message and will not reserve resources for the flow.

Those who want to listen to them send a corresponding resv (short for reserve) message, which then traces the path back to the sender. The resv message contains a flowspec. The resv message also has a filterspec object; it defines the packets that will receive the requested QoS defined in the flowspec. A simple filter spec could be just the sender’s IP address and optionally its UDP or TCP port. When a router receives the RSVP resv message it will:

1. Make a reservation based on the request parameters. Admission control processes the request parameters and can either instruct the packet classifier to correctly handle the selected subset of data packets or negotiate with the upper layer how the packet handling should be performed. If they cannot be supported, a reject message is sent to let the listener know.
2. Forward the request upstream (in the direction of the sender). At each node the flowspec in the resv message can be modified by a forwarding node (e.g., in the case of a multicast flow reservation, the reservation requests can be merged).
3. The routers then store the nature of the flow and optionally set up policing according to the flowspec for it.

If nothing is heard for a certain length of time, the reservation will time out and will be canceled. This solves the problem if either the sender or the receiver crashes or is shut down without first canceling the reservation.

== Other features ==
Integrity
RSVP messages are appended with a message digest created by combining the message contents and a shared key using a message digest algorithm (commonly MD5). The key can be distributed and confirmed using two message types: integrity challenge request and integrity challenge response.
Error reporting
When a node detects an error, an error message is generated with an error code and is propagated upstream on the reverse path to the sender.
Information on RSVP flow
Two types of diagnostic messages allow a network operator to request the RSVP state information on a specific flow.
Diagnostic facility
An extension to the standard that allows a user to collect information about the RSVP state along a path.

=== RFCs ===
- RFC 2205
- RFC 2210
- RFC 2211
- RFC 2212
