= ODG =

ODG can refer to:

- .odg, the file extension for an OpenDocument drawing file
- Ontario Drive and Gear Limited, a former company specializing in amphibious vehicles; now part of ARGO
- Old Dungeon Ghyll, Lake District, England, popular with walkers and climbers
- Objective difference grade, a perceived quality in digital audio
- Olive drab green, a color used in military clothing and equipment
- Overseas Development Group, a fictional UK espionage agency that James Bond works for in Carte Blanche by Jeffery Deaver.
