= Differentiated services =

Networking architecture for prioritizing traffic

Differentiated services or DiffServ is a computer networking architecture that specifies a mechanism for classifying and managing network traffic and providing quality of service (QoS) on modern IP networks. DiffServ can, for example, be used to provide low latency to critical network traffic such as voice or streaming media while providing best-effort service to non-critical services such as web traffic or file transfers.

DiffServ uses a 6-bit differentiated services code point (DSCP) in the 6-bit differentiated services field (DS field) in the IP header for packet classification purposes. The DS field, together with the ECN field, replaces the outdated IPv4 TOS field.

== Background ==
Modern data networks carry many different types of services, including voice, video, streaming music, web pages and email. Many of the proposed QoS mechanisms that allowed these services to co-exist were both complex and failed to scale to meet the demands of the public Internet. In December 1998, the IETF replaced the TOS and IP precedence fields in the IPv4 header with the DS field, which was later split to refer to only the top 6 bits with the ECN field in the bottom two bits. In the IPv6 header the DS field is part of the Traffic Class field where it occupies the 6 most significant bits.

In the DS field, a range of eight values (class selectors) is used for backward compatibility with the former IPv4 IP precedence field. Today, DiffServ has largely supplanted TOS and other layer-3 QoS mechanisms, such as integrated services (IntServ), as the primary architecture routers use to provide QoS.

== Traffic management mechanisms ==
DiffServ is a coarse-grained, class-based mechanism for traffic management. In contrast, IntServ is a fine-grained, flow-based mechanism. DiffServ relies on a mechanism to classify and mark packets as belonging to a specific class. DiffServ-aware routers implement per-hop behaviors (PHBs), which define the packet-forwarding properties associated with a class of traffic. Different PHBs may be defined to offer, for example, low-loss or low-latency service.

Rather than differentiating network traffic based on the requirements of an individual flow, DiffServ operates on the principle of traffic classification, placing each data packet into one of a limited number of traffic classes. Each router on the network is then configured to differentiate traffic based on its class. Each traffic class can be managed differently, ensuring preferential treatment for higher-priority traffic on the network. The premise of DiffServ is that complicated functions such as packet classification and policing can be carried out at the edge of the network by edge routers. Since no classification and policing is required in the core routers, functionality there can then be kept simple. Core routers simply apply PHB treatment to packets based on their markings. PHB treatment is achieved by core routers using a combination of scheduling policy and queue management policy.

A group of routers that implement common, administratively defined DiffServ policies are referred to as a DiffServ domain.

While DiffServ does recommend a standardized set of traffic classes, the DiffServ architecture does not incorporate predetermined judgments of what types of traffic should be given priority treatment. DiffServ simply provides a framework to allow classification and differentiated treatment. The standard traffic classes (discussed below) serve to simplify interoperability between different networks and different vendors' equipment.

== Classification and marking ==
Network traffic entering a DiffServ domain is subjected to classification and conditioning. A traffic classifier may inspect many different parameters in incoming packets, such as source address, destination address or traffic type and assign individual packets to a specific traffic class. Traffic classifiers may honor any DiffServ markings in received packets or may elect to ignore or override those markings. For tight control over volumes and type of traffic in a given class, a network operator may choose not to honor markings at the ingress to the DiffServ domain. Traffic in each class may be further conditioned by subjecting the traffic to rate limiters, traffic policers or shapers.

The per-hop behavior is determined by the DS and ECN fields in the IP header. The DS field contains the 6-bit DSCP value. Explicit Congestion Notification (ECN) occupies the least-significant 2 bits of the IPv4 TOS field and IPv6 traffic class (TC) field.

In theory, a network could have up to 64 different traffic classes using the 64 available DSCP values. The DiffServ RFCs recommend, but do not require, certain encodings. This gives a network operator great flexibility in defining traffic classes. In practice, however, most networks use the following commonly defined per-hop behaviors:

- Default Forwarding (DF) PHB — which is typically best-effort traffic
- Expedited Forwarding (EF) PHB — dedicated to low-loss, low-latency traffic
- Assured Forwarding (AF) PHB — gives assurance of delivery under prescribed conditions
- Class Selector PHBs — which maintain backward compatibility with the IP precedence field.

=== Default Forwarding ===
A default forwarding (DF) PHB is the only required behavior. Essentially, any traffic that does not meet the requirements of any of the other defined classes uses DF. Typically, DF has best-effort forwarding characteristics. The recommended DSCP for DF is 0.

=== Expedited Forwarding ===
The IETF defines Expedited Forwarding (EF) behavior in RFC 3246. The EF PHB has the characteristics of low delay, low loss and low jitter. These characteristics are suitable for voice, video and other realtime services. EF traffic is often given strict priority queuing above all other traffic classes. Because an overload of EF traffic will cause queuing delays and affect the jitter and delay tolerances within the class, admission control, traffic policing and other mechanisms may be applied to EF traffic. The recommended DSCP for EF is 101110_{B} (46 or 2E_{H}).

=== Voice Admit ===
The IETF defines Voice Admit behavior in RFC 5865. The Voice Admit PHB has identical characteristics to the Expedited Forwarding PHB. However, Voice Admit traffic is also admitted by the network using a Call Admission Control (CAC) procedure. The recommended DSCP for voice admit is 101100_{B} (44 or 2C_{H}).

=== Assured Forwarding ===
The IETF defines the Assured Forwarding (AF) behavior in RFC 2597 and RFC 3260. Assured forwarding allows the operator to provide assurance of delivery as long as the traffic does not exceed some subscribed rate. Traffic that exceeds the subscription rate faces a higher probability of being dropped if congestion occurs.

The AF behavior group defines four separate AF classes, with all traffic within one class having the same priority. Within each class, packets are given a drop precedence (high, medium or low, where higher precedence means more dropping). The combination of classes and drop precedence yields twelve separate DSCP encodings from AF11 through AF43 (see table).

Assured Forwarding behavior group
| Drop probability | Class 1 | Class 2 | Class 3 | Class 4 |
|---|---|---|---|---|
| Low | AF11 (DSCP 10) 001010 | AF21 (DSCP 18) 010010 | AF31 (DSCP 26) 011010 | AF41 (DSCP 34) 100010 |
| Medium | AF12 (DSCP 12) 001100 | AF22 (DSCP 20) 010100 | AF32 (DSCP 28) 011100 | AF42 (DSCP 36) 100100 |
| High | AF13 (DSCP 14) 001110 | AF23 (DSCP 22) 010110 | AF33 (DSCP 30) 011110 | AF43 (DSCP 38) 100110 |

Some measure of priority and proportional fairness is defined between traffic in different classes. Should congestion occur between classes, the traffic in the higher class is given priority. Rather than using strict priority queuing, more balanced queue servicing algorithms such as fair queuing or weighted fair queuing are likely to be used. If congestion occurs within a class, the packets with the higher drop precedence are discarded first. Re-marking a packet is sometimes used to increase its drop precedence if a stream's bandwidth exceeds a certain threshold. For example, a stream whose rate is above the Committed Information Rate (CIR) as defined in RFC 2697 causes the stream to be marked with a higher AF drop precedence. This allows the decision as to when to shape the stream to devices further downstream if they encounter congestion. To prevent issues associated with tail drop, more sophisticated drop selection algorithms such as random early detection are often used.

=== Class Selector ===
Class Selector mapping
| Service class | DSCP Name | DSCP Value | IP precedence | Examples of application |
|---|---|---|---|---|
| Standard | CS0 (DF) | 0 | 0 (000) | NTP |
| Low-priority data | CS1 | 8 | 1 (001) | File transfer (FTP, SMB) |
| Network operations, administration and management (OAM) | CS2 | 16 | 2 (010) | SNMP, SSH, Ping, Telnet, syslog |
| Broadcast video | CS3 | 24 | 3 (011) | RTSP broadcast TV; streaming of live audio and video events; video surveillance; video-on-demand |
| Real-time interactive | CS4 | 32 | 4 (100) | Gaming, low-priority video conferencing |
| Signaling | CS5 | 40 | 5 (101) | Peer-to-peer (SIP, H.323), client-server IP telephony signaling (H.248, MEGACO, MGCP, SCCP) |
| Network control | CS6 | 48 | 6 (110) | Routing protocols (OSPF, BGP, IS-IS, RIP) |
| Reserved for future use | CS7 | 56 | 7 (111) | |

DF= Default Forwarding

Prior to DiffServ, IPv4 networks could use the IP precedence field in the TOS byte of the IPv4 header to mark priority traffic. The TOS octet and IP precedence were not widely used. The IETF agreed to reuse the TOS octet as the DS field for DiffServ networks, later splitting it into the DS field and ECN field. In order to maintain backward compatibility with network devices that still use the Precedence field, DiffServ defines the Class Selector PHB.

The Class Selector code points are of the binary form 'xxx000'. The first three bits are the former IP precedence bits. Each IP precedence value can be mapped into a DiffServ class. IP precedence 0 maps to CS0, IP precedence 1 to CS1, and so on. If a packet is received from a non-DiffServ-aware router that used IP precedence markings, the DiffServ router can still understand the encoding as a Class Selector code point.

Specific recommendations for use of Class Selector code points are given in RFC 4594.

=== Configuration guidelines ===
RFC 4594 offers detailed and specific recommendations for the use and configuration of code points. Other RFCs, such as RFC 8622, have updated these recommendations. A full list is provided in the IETF DSCP code point registry.

IETF RFC 4594 recommendations (with updates)
| Service class | DSCP Name | DSCP Value | Conditioning at DS edge | PHB | Queuing | AQM | RFC 5127 treatment aggregate |
|---|---|---|---|---|---|---|---|
| Network control | CS6 | 48 | See section 3.1 | RFC 2474 | Rate | Yes | Network control |
| Telephony | EF | 46 | Police using sr+bs | RFC 3246 | Priority | No | Realtime (EF) |
| Telephony, Capacity-Admitted | VOICE-ADMIT | 44 | Police using sr+bs | RFC 5865 | Priority | No | Realtime (EF) |
| Signaling | CS5 | 40 | Police using sr+bs | RFC 2474 | Rate | No | Realtime (EF) |
| Multimedia conferencing | AF41, AF42, AF43 | 34, 36, 38 | Using two-rate, three-color marker (such as RFC 2698) | RFC 2597 | Rate | Yes per DSCP | Realtime (EF) |
| Real-time interactive | CS4 | 32 | Police using sr+bs | RFC 2474 | Rate | No | Realtime (EF) |
| Broadcast video | CS3 | 24 | Police using sr+bs | RFC 2474 | Rate | No | Realtime (EF) |
| OAM | CS2 | 16 | Police using sr+bs | RFC 2474 | Rate | Yes | Assured elastic (AF3) |
| Multimedia streaming | AF31, AF32, AF33 | 26, 28, 30 | Using two-rate, three-color marker (such as RFC 2698) | RFC 2597 | Rate | Yes per DSCP | Assured elastic (AF3) |
| Low-latency data | AF21, AF22, AF23 | 18, 20, 22 | Using single-rate, three-color marker (such as RFC 2697) | RFC 2597 | Rate | Yes per DSCP | Assured elastic (AF2) |
| High-throughput data | AF11, AF12, AF13 | 10, 12, 14 | Using two-rate, three-color marker (such as RFC 2698) | RFC 2597 | Rate | Yes per DSCP | Assured elastic (AF1) |
| Standard | DF | 0 | Not applicable | RFC 2474 | Rate | Yes | Elastic (DF) |
| Non-Queue-Building | NQB | 45 | With separate queue and traffic protection | draft-ietf-tsvwg-nqb | NQB | N/A | Elastic (DF) |
| Lower-effort | LE | 1 | Not applicable | RFC 8622 | Priority | Yes | Elastic (DF) lower priority |
| Lower-effort | CS1 (legacy) | 8 | Not applicable | RFC 3662 | Priority | Yes | Elastic (DF) lower priority |

sr+bs = single rate with burst size control (such as a token bucket).

== Design considerations ==
Under DiffServ, all the policing and classifying are done at the boundaries between DiffServ domains. This means that in the core of the Internet, routers are unhindered by the complexities of collecting payment or enforcing agreements. That is, in contrast to IntServ, DiffServ requires no advance setup, no reservation, and no time-consuming end-to-end negotiation for each flow.

The details of how individual routers deal with the DS field are configuration specific, therefore, it is difficult to predict end-to-end behavior. This is complicated further if a packet crosses two or more DiffServ domains before reaching its destination. From a commercial viewpoint, this means that it is impossible to sell different classes of end-to-end connectivity to end users, as one provider's Gold packet may be another's Bronze. DiffServ or any other IP-based QoS marking does not ensure the quality of the service or a specified service-level agreement (SLA). By marking the packets, the sender indicates that it wants the packets to be treated as a specific service, but there is no guarantee this happens. It is up to all the service providers and their routers in the path to ensure that their policies will take care of the packets in an appropriate fashion.

== Bandwidth broker ==
A Bandwidth Broker in the framework of DiffServ is an agent that has some knowledge of an organization's priorities and policies and allocates bandwidth with respect to those policies. In order to achieve an end-to-end allocation of resources across separate domains, the Bandwidth Broker managing a domain will have to communicate with its adjacent peers, which allows end-to-end services to be constructed out of purely bilateral agreements.

== DiffServ RFCs ==
- RFC 2474 — Definition of the differentiated services field (DS field) in the IPv4 and IPv6 headers. Note that the DS field of 8 bits (the bottom two unused) in was later split into the current 6-bit DS field and a separate 2-bit ECN field.
- RFC 2475 — An architecture for differentiated services.
- RFC 2597 — Assured forwarding PHB group.
- RFC 2983 — Differentiated services and tunnels.
- RFC 3086 — Definition of differentiated services per-domain behaviors and rules for their specification.
- RFC 3140 — Per hop behavior identification codes. (Obsoletes RFC 2836.
- RFC 3246 — An expedited forwarding PHB. (Obsoletes RFC 2598.)
- RFC 3247 — Supplemental information for the new definition of the EF PHB (expedited forwarding per-hop behavior).
- RFC 3260 — New Terminology and Clarifications for Diffserv. (Updates RFC 2474, RFC 2475 and RFC 2597.)
- RFC 4594 — Configuration Guidelines for DiffServ Service Classes.
- RFC 5865 — A differentiated services code point (DSCP) for capacity-admitted traffic. (Updates RFC 4542 and RFC 4594.)
- RFC 8622 — A Lower-Effort Per-Hop Behavior (LE PHB) for Differentiated Services. (Updates RFC 4594 and RFC 8325, obsoletes RFC 3662.)

=== DiffServ Management RFCs ===
- RFC 3289 — Management information base for the differentiated services architecture.
- RFC 3290 — An informal management model for differentiated services routers.
- RFC 3317 — Differentiated services quality of service policy information base.

== See also ==
- Class of service
- Teletraffic engineering
