= BSSGP =

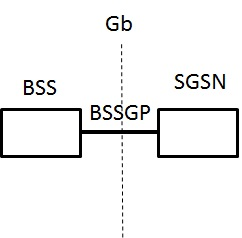
BSSGP

BSSGP is a protocol used in the GPRS mobile packet data system. It denotes Base Station System GPRS Protocol. It transfers information between two GPRS entities SGSN and BSS over a BSSGP Virtual Connection (BVC). This protocol provides radio-related quality of service and routing information that is required to transmit user data between a BSS and an SGSN. It does not carry out any form of error correction.

BSSGP is used to handle the flow control between SGSN and BSS. The flow control mechanism implemented in SGSN node, only for GSM, is used to prevent congestion and loss of data due to overload in the BSS. This mechanism controls the flow from the SGSN to the BSS but not in the uplink direction.

The primary functions of BSSGP include:

- Provision by an SGSN to a BSS of a radio related information used by the RLC/MAC function in the download link.
- Provision by a BSS to an SGSN of radio related information derived from the RLC/MAC function in the uplink.
- Provision of functionality to enable two physically distinct nodes, an SGSN, a BSS, to operate node management control functions (QoS, flow control).

It is specified in 3GPP TS 48.018.
