= Cross-layer interaction and service mapping =

Cross-layer interaction and service mapping (CLIASM) was designed for achieving QoS for wireless network.

P. Venkata Krishna et al., proposed a cross-layer QoS model called CLIASM for MANET. This model proposes a back and forth flow mechanism for sharing information. A shared database is being utilized to enable layers share information though each layer is performing different function. Between two layers two interfaces are created to enable flow of information on both sides. The model is implemented based on the division of network features according to layers as application layer metrics (ALM), transport layer metrics (TLM), network layer metrics (NLM) and MAC layer metrics (MLM). But in deploying several cross-layering approaches, one has to keep in mind the possibilities of occurrence of unintended interactions and side effects. Conflicting interactions may create stability problems and result performance degradation.
