= Per-hop behaviour =

Policy and priority applied to a packet when traversing a network hop

In computer networking, per-hop behaviour (PHB) is a term used in differentiated services (DiffServ) or Multiprotocol Label Switching (MPLS). It defines the policy and priority applied to a packet when traversing a hop (such as a router) in a DiffServ network.

== See also ==
- Best-effort delivery
- Differentiated services § Traffic management mechanisms
