= Absolute Category Rating =

Test method used in quality tests

A five-level scale for rating quality.

Absolute Category Rating (ACR) is a test method used in quality tests.

The levels of the scale are, sorted by quality in decreasing order:

- Excellent
- Good
- Fair
- Poor
- Bad

In this method, a single test condition (generally an image or a video sequence) is presented to the viewers once only. They should then give a quality rating on an ACR scale. Test conditions should be presented in a random order per test person.

The ACR scale is evaluated based on numbers that are assigned to the individual items, where Excellent equals to 5 and Bad equals to 1. The average numeric score over all experiment participants, for each test condition that was shown, is called the mean opinion score. It may also be used for telephony voice quality to give a mean opinion score.

== See also ==
- Mean opinion score
- Subjective video quality
