= TIA/EIA-920 =

Standard for high-quality digital telephony

TIA/EIA-920 is a telecommunications standard from the US Telecommunications Industry Association, a 1988 offshoot of the EIA. The standard establishes wideband audio performance requirements for wireline telephones which transmit their signals digitally. Audio wideband is defined as 150 Hz to 6800 Hz. The technical standard refers to handsets, headsets, and speakerphones. It does not specify digital protocols or encoding formats. Nor does it concern how the transducers are connected to the telephone.

== History ==
The TIA Engineering Committee TR-41.3.3 published TIA-920, Transmission Requirements for Wideband Digital Wireline Telephones in December 2002. It was designed as a wideband version of the previous narrowband standard, TIA/EIA-810-A. The 920 standard completed the function of the working group which was then disbanded. (TIA Press Release)

=== TIA-920-A ===
In February 2011 the Committee TR-41.3 published the documents TIA-920.000-A (overview), TIA-920.110-A (Requirements for Handset UE) and TIA-920.130-A (Requirements for Headset UE).

== See also ==
- VOIP
- Private branch exchange
