= Perceptual Evaluation of Speech Quality =

ITU-T standard

Perceptual Evaluation of Speech Quality (PESQ) is a family of standards comprising a test methodology for automated assessment of the speech quality as experienced by a user of a telephony system. It was standardized as Recommendation ITU-T P.862 in 2001. PESQ is used for objective voice quality testing by phone manufacturers, network equipment vendors and telecom operators. Its usage requires a license. The first edition of PESQ's successor POLQA (Recommendation ITU-T P.863) entered into force in 2011.

== Measurement scope ==
PESQ was developed to model subjective tests commonly used in telecommunications (e.g., Recommendation ITU-T P.800) to assess the voice quality perceived by human beings. Consequently, it employs true voice samples as test signals. In order to characterize the listening quality as perceived by users, it is of paramount importance to load modern telecom equipment with speech-like signals. Many systems are optimized for speech and would respond in an unpredictable way to non-speech signals (e.g., tones, noise). Guidelines for proper applications of voice test samples are defined in the PESQ application guide contained in Recommendation ITU-T P.862.3.

== Genealogy of related standards ==
ITU-T's family of full reference objective voice quality measurements started in 1997 with Recommendation ITU-T P.861 (PSQM), which was superseded by ITU-T P.862 (PESQ) in 2001. P.862 was later complemented with Recommendations ITU-T P.862.1 (mapping of PESQ scores to a MOS scale), ITU-T P.862.2 (wideband measurements) and ITU-T P.862.3 (application guide). The first edition of ITU-T P.863 (POLQA) entered into force in 2011. An Application guide for Recommendation ITU-T P.863 was approved in 2019 and published as ITU-T P.863.1.

In addition to the above listed full reference methods, the list of ITU-T's objective voice quality measurement standards also includes ITU-T P.563 (no-reference algorithm).

== Testing typology ==
Depending on the information that is made available to an algorithm, voice-quality test algorithms can be divided into two main categories:

- A "full reference" (FR) algorithm has access to and makes use of the original reference signal for a comparison (i.e., a difference analysis). It can compare each sample of the reference signal (talker side) to each corresponding sample of the degraded signal (listener side). FR measurements deliver the highest accuracy and repeatability but can only be applied for dedicated tests in live networks (e.g., drive test tools for mobile network benchmarks).
- A "no reference" (NR) algorithm only uses the degraded signal for the quality estimation and has no information of the original reference signal. NR algorithms (e.g., Recommendation ITU-T P.563) are low-accuracy estimates only, as the originating voice characteristics (e.g., male or female talker, background noise, non-voice) of the source reference is completely unknown. A common variant of NR algorithms does not even analyze the decoded audio signal, but works on an analysis of the digital bit stream on an IP packet level. The measurement is consequently limited to a transport-stream analysis.

PESQ is a full-reference algorithm and analyzes the speech signal sample-by-sample after a temporal alignment of corresponding excerpts of reference and test signal. PESQ can be applied to provide an end-to-end (E2E) quality assessment for a network, or characterize individual network components.

PESQ results principally model mean opinion scores (MOS) that cover a scale from 1 (bad) to 5 (excellent). A mapping function to MOS-LQO is outlined in Recommendation ITU-T P.862.1.

== See also ==
- Perceptual Objective Listening Quality Analysis (POLQA)
- Perceptual Evaluation of Video Quality (PEVQ)
- Perceptual Evaluation of Audio Quality (PEAQ)
- Hearing-Aid Speech Quality Index (HASQI)
