= Next Steps in Signaling =

Next Steps in Signaling (NSIS) was an Internet Engineering Task Force working group focusing on the design of a next generation signaling protocol framework and protocol specifications.

The NSIS working group was chartered in late 2001 to work on a replacement for Resource Reservation Protocol (RSVP). Chairs included Jukka Manner and Martin Stiemerling. The overall framework of NSIS was presented in 2005. In 2006, the group submitted the first protocol specification for approval by the Internet Engineering Steering Group (IESG). In October 2010, the actual protocol specifications were finally approved and released within the Request for Comments (RFC) series. The work concluded in 2011.

The NSIS protocol suite includes three primary protocols:

- The General Internet Signalling Transport protocol (GIST)
- The QoS signaling protocol QoS NSLP
- The NAT/Firewall signaling protocol NAT/FW NSLP

The QoS NSLP seeks to replace the Resource Reservation Protocol (RSVP) for signaling resource reservations to Internet routers.

The NAT/Firewall NSLP provides a means to talk to network middleboxes, such as firewalls NATs, to punch holes and set up IP address mappings.
