= Perceptual Evaluation of Video Quality =

Video quality metric

Perceptual Evaluation of Video Quality (PEVQ) is an end-to-end (E2E) measurement algorithm to score the picture quality of a video presentation by means of a 5-point mean opinion score (MOS). It is, therefore, a video quality model. PEVQ was benchmarked by the Video Quality Experts Group (VQEG) in the course of the Multimedia Test Phase 2007–2008. Based on the performance results, in which the accuracy of PEVQ was tested against ratings obtained by human viewers, PEVQ became part of the new International Standard.

== Application ==
The measurement algorithm can be applied to analyze visible artifacts caused by a digital video encoding/decoding (or transcoding) process, radio- or IP-based transmission networks and end-user devices. Application scenarios address next generation networking and mobile services and include IPTV (Standard-definition television and HDTV), streaming video, Mobile TV, video telephony, video conferencing and video messaging.

The measurement paradigm is to assess degradations of a decoded video sequence output from the network (for example as received by a TV set top box) in comparison to the original reference picture (broadcast from the studio). Consequently, the setup is referred to as end-to-end (E2E) quality testing.

== Algorithm ==
The development for picture quality analysis algorithms available today started with still image models which were later enhanced to also cover motion pictures. PEVQ is full-reference algorithm (see the classification of models in video quality) and analyzes the picture pixel-by-pixel after a temporal alignment (also referred to as 'temporal registration') of corresponding frames of reference and test signal. PEVQ MOS results range from 1 (bad) to 5 (excellent) and indicate the perceived quality of the decoded sequence.

PEVQ is based on modeling the behavior of the human visual system. In addition to an overall MOS score, PEVQ quantifies abnormalities in the video signal by a variety of KPIs, including PSNR, distortion indicators and lip-sync delay.

== See also ==
- Mean opinion score
- Peak signal-to-noise ratio (PSNR)
- Subjective video quality
- Video quality
