= Network service provider =

Proposed role in the Internet economy

Network service provider (NSP) is one of the roles defined in the National Information Infrastructure (NII) plan, which governed the transition of the Internet from US federal control to private-sector governance, with an accompanying shift from the 1968-1992 single-payer economy to a competitive market economy. The plan envisioned network service providers as a wholesale layer, moving Internet bandwidth produced at Network Access Points (subsequently called "Internet exchange points") to Internet service providers, who would in turn sell it to end-user enterprises, or on to Internet Access Providers (IAPs) who would sell it to individual end-users in their homes. In fact, the original Network Service Providers quickly vertically integrated with Internet service providers and Internet Access Providers, through the mid-1990s, creating conglomerates and reducing competition.

Now, the term may refer to telecommunications companies, data carriers, wireless communications providers, Internet service providers, and cable television operators offering Internet access.

== See also ==
- Autonomous system (Internet)
- Internet exchange point
