= Marié Digby discography =

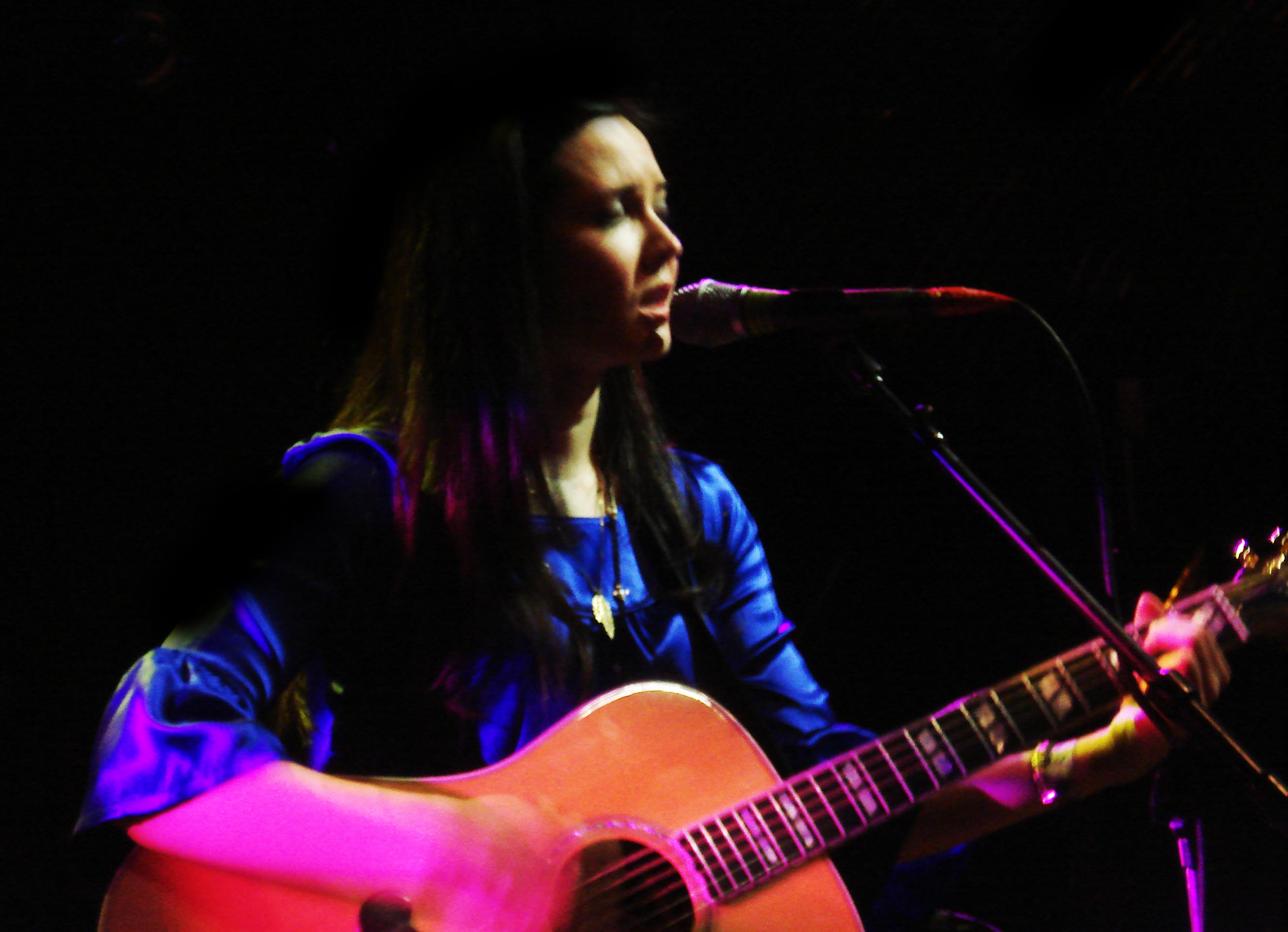
- Digby at The Troubadour in 2007
- Studio albums: 6
- Extended plays: 4
- Singles: 5
- Music videos: 6

American musician Marié Digby has released six studio albums, four extended plays, five singles, and six music videos. Her debut single, a cover of Rihanna's "Umbrella", was released in 2007 and charted on the Billboard Bubbling Under Hot 100 Singles and Adult Top 40 charts. This song and her only other charted single to date - 2008's "Say It Again" - preceded her debut album, Unfold, which debuted at number 29 on the Billboard 200 upon its April 2008 release.

== Albums ==
=== Studio albums ===
List of albums, with selected chart positions, sales and certifications
Title	Album details	Peak chart positions		
Title	Album details	US	JPN	KOR
Unfold	Released: April 8, 2008; Label: Hollywood; Formats: CD, LP, digital download	29	49	78
Second Home	Released: March 4, 2009; Label: Avex Trax; Formats:	—	134	—
Breathing Underwater	Released: June 24, 2009 (Note: Breathing Underwater was only released in Japan on June 24, 2009 and was released internationally on September 15, 2009.); Label: Hollywood; Formats: CD, LP, digital download	183	111	—
Your Love	Release: September 16, 2011; Label: Star/MCA Music; Formats: CD, digital download	—	—	—
Winter Fields	Release: October 29, 2013; Label: Independent; Formats: CD, digital download	—	—	—
Pop Covers	Release: June 22, 2018; Label: Independent; Formats: Digital download	—	—	—
"—" denotes a recording that did not chart or was not released in that territory.

== Extended plays ==
List of extended plays, with select release details
Title	Album details
Start Here	Released: September 11, 2007; Label: Hollywood; Formats: Digital download
Chimera	Released: August 16, 2014; Label: Independent; Formats: Digital download
Wildfire	Released: February 9, 2018; Label: Independent; Formats: Digital download
Songs of Us	Released: May 8, 2020; Label: Independent; Formats: Digital download

== Singles ==
List of singles, with selected chart positions, showing year released and album name
Title	Year	Peak chart positions				Sales	Album
Title	Year	US Bubbling	US Adult	KOR	KOR Intl.	Sales	Album
"Umbrella"	2007	10	33	97	8	KOR: 411,649	Start Here EP
"Say It Again"	2008	—	21	—	28	KOR: 271,965	Unfold
"Avalanche"	2009	—	—	—	—		Breathing Underwater
"Symphony"	2009	—	—	—	—		Breathing Underwater
"Your Love"	2011	—	—	84	6	KOR: 348,727	Your Love
"Falling for You" (Duet with JayR)	2013	—	—	—	—		Non-album single
"—" denotes a recording that did not chart or was not released in that territory.

== Music videos ==
Year	Title
2008	"Say It Again"
2009	"Feel"
2009	"Avalanche"
2011	"Your Love"
2011	"Your Love" (duet with Sam Milby)
2013	"Falling for You" (duet with Jay R)
