= Chimera =

Chimera, Chimaera, or Chimaira (Greek for "she-goat") originally referred to:

- Chimera (mythology), a fire-breathing monster of ancient Lycia said to combine parts from multiple animals
- Mount Chimaera, a fire-spewing region of Lycia or Cilicia typically considered the inspiration for the myth

Chimera, chimera, chimère, Chimaira, etc. may also refer to:

== Biology ==
- Chimaera, various cartilaginous fishes of the order Chimaeriformes
  - Chimaera (genus), the eponymous genus of the order Chimaeriformes
- Chimera (EST), a single cDNA sequence originating from two transcripts
- Chimera (genetics), a single organism with cells from two different zygotes
- Chimera (virus), with genetic material from other organisms
- Chimeric protein or fusion protein
- Chimera (paleontology), a fossil made with parts from different animals
- Chimera Project, a Soviet biological weapons program

== Media ==
=== Fictional entities ===
- Chimera (Fullmetal Alchemist), characters
- Chimera (Marvel Comics), the name of different characters from Marvel Comics
- Chimera (DC Comics), the name of different characters from DC Comics
- Chimera (Dungeons & Dragons), a magical beast
- Chimera Anima, a name grouping of animals in the anime Tokyo Mew Mew
- The Chimera, an alien race in Resistance
- Chimera ants, a group of deadly and invasive mutant bugs in the anime and manga series Hunter × Hunter
- Chimera Motorama (film), the name of the fictional gas company that gave out the MOTORAMA game playing pieces

=== Films ===
- Chimera (1968 film), Italian musicarello
- Chimera (2001 film), Italian romance
- Chimère (film), France, 1989
- Chimères (film), 2013
- Chimera Strain, a 2018 Indian-American film
- La Chimera, a 2023 romantic drama

=== Gaming ===
- Chimaera (magazine), a British zine dedicated to postal board games, 1975–1983
- Chimera (video game), a 1985 adventure
- Chimera (larp convention), Auckland, New Zealand
- Chimera Entertainment, a game developer, Munich, Germany

=== Literature ===
- The Chimeras, 1854 sonnets by Gérard de Nerval
- Chimaira, a 2001 novel by Valerio Massimo Manfredi
- Chimera (Barth novel) (1972)
- Chimera (CrossGen), a 2003 comic book series
- Chimaera (novel), by Ian Irvine, 2004
- "Chimera" (short story), by Lee Youngdo
- Chimera (2015), novel in Mira Grant's Parasitology trilogy
- Chimera Kō, by Baku Yumemakura, Japan

=== Music ===
==== Groups or artists ====
- Chimaira, an American heavy metal band from Cleveland, Ohio
- Chimera (Irish band), a musical group
- Chimera (Russian band), an underground musical band
- Mike Dred or Chimera (born 1967), techno musician

==== Albums ====
- Chimaira (album), 2005
- Chimera (Andromeda album), 2006
- Chimera (Aria album), 2001
- Chimera (Delerium album), 2003
- Chimera (Erik Friedlander album), 1995
- Chimera (Mayhem album), 2004
- Chimera (Bill Nelson album), 1983
- Chimeras (album), 2003, by John Zorn
- Chimera, by the Cost, 2002
- Chimera, by Duncan Mackay, 1974
- 鵺-chimera-, a 2016 EP by Girugamesh
- Chimera, a 2009 EP by Chris Pureka
- Chimera, a 2014 EP by Marié Digby

==== Songs ====
- "Chimeres I, II and III", 2007 compositions by Fred Momotenko
- "Chimera", by Duncan Sheik, Daylight (Duncan Sheik album)
- "Chimaera", by Bad Religion from Generator
- "Chimera", by the Tea Party from Triptych
- "Chimeras", by Tim Hecker from Harmony in Ultraviolet
- "Chimera", by Bonham from Mad Hatter
- "The Chimera", by the Smashing Pumpkins from Oceania
- "Chimera", by Polyphia from Remember That You Will Die
- "Chimera", by Takanashi Kiara from Vogelfrei

=== Television ===
- Chimera (British TV series), 1991
- "Chimera" (NCIS), an episode
- "Chimera" Star Trek: Deep Space Nine), 1999
- "Chimera" (Stargate SG-1), an episode
- "Chimera" (The X-Files), an episode
- Chimera (South Korean TV series), 2021

== People ==
- Jason Chimera (born 1979), NHL ice hockey player
- Ricardo Rodriguez (wrestler) (b. 1986), wrestler, known by the ring name "Chimaera"

== Computing ==
- Chimera (software library)
- Camino (web browser) or Chimera
- UCSF Chimera, software to visualize molecules
- Chimera Linux, a Linux distribution

== Other uses ==
- Chimaera (town), ancient Himarë, Albania
- Chimaera Mountains, an ancient Ceraunian Range, Albania
- Chimera Society, senior society at Dartmouth College
- Chimera (spacecraft), a space exploration mission proposal
- Chimera (architecture), or grotesque
- TVR Chimaera, a car
- Chimera (roller coaster), La Feria Chapultepec Mágico, Mexico City
- Chimera, a hypersonic aircraft engine being developed by the American startup Hermeus
- 623 Chimaera, a main-belt asteroid
- French frigate Chimère

== See also ==
- Quimera International Festival, Metepec, Toluca, Mexico
