= Kimera =

Kimera may refer to:

== People ==
- Kimera (singer), Korean opera singer
- Kimera of Buganda, king of the Kingdom of Buganda
- Kimera Bartee (1972–2021), American baseball player and coach

== Others ==
- Kimera (manga), manga series written and illustrated by Kodaka Kazuma
- Kimera, species in the science fiction television series, Earth: Final Conflict
- Kimera Automobili, Italian automobile company

== See also ==
- Chimera (disambiguation)
