= Mini Superleggera Vision =

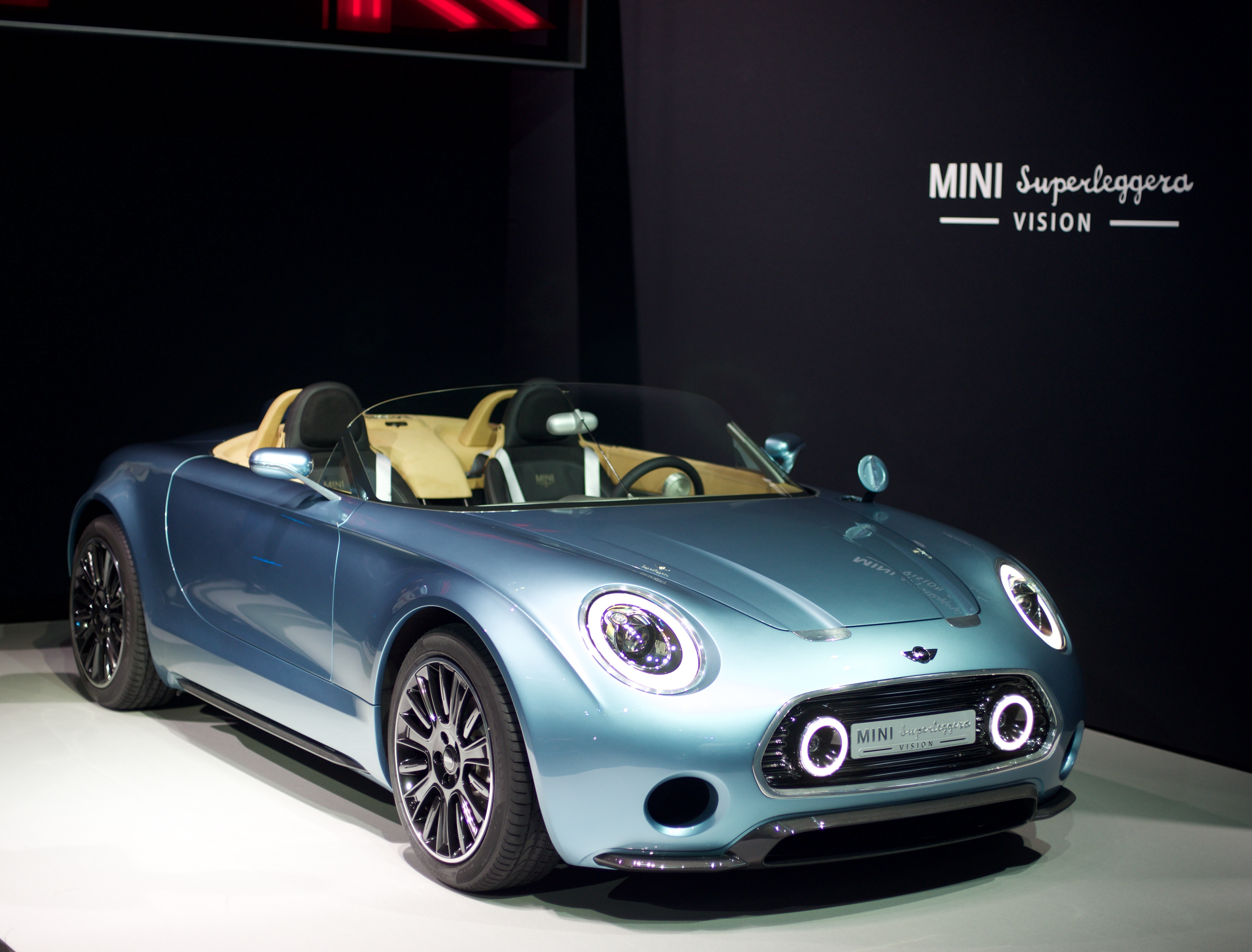

Overview
- Production: 2014

Body and chassis
- Class: Concept car

The Mini Superleggera Vision is a concept car unveiled by Mini in 2014. Developed in collaboration with the Italian coachbuilder Touring Superleggera, the two-seat roadster was designed as a modern interpretation of classic British and Italian automotive styling and served as a preview of a potential future open-top Mini model.

== Overview ==
The Mini Superleggera Vision was revealed at the Concorso d'Eleganza Villa d'Este in Italy in May 2014, alongside several concepts from BMW Group brands. The project was jointly conceived by Mini's design team in Munich and Touring Superleggera's coachbuilding workshop in Milan. Mini was responsible for the vehicle's styling, while Touring Superleggera constructed the body using traditional hand-shaped metal sheet techniques.
