= Kimera Evo 37 =

Motor vehicle

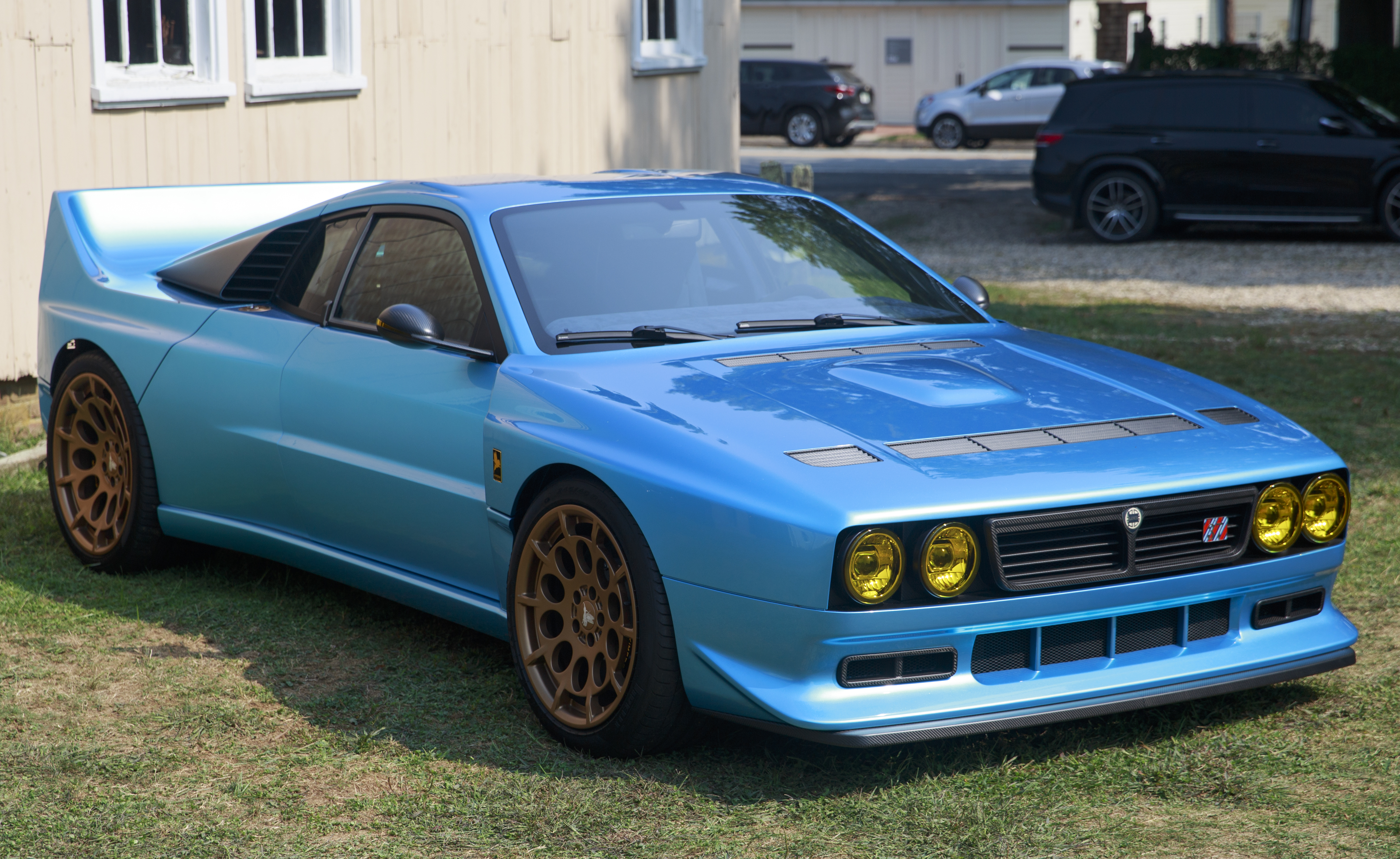

Overview
- Manufacturer: Kimera Automobili
- Also called: Kimera EVO38
- Model years: 2021–present (Limited to 37 units)
- Assembly: Cuneo, Italy

Body and chassis
- Class: Sports car (S)
- Body style: 2-door coupe
- Layout: Rear mid-engine, rear-wheel-drive

Powertrain
- Engine: 2.1 L Kimera 232 AR4 twincharged I4
- Power output: 505 PS (371 kW; 498 hp)
- Transmission: 6-speed manual

Dimensions
- Wheelbase: 2,520 mm (99.2 in)
- Length: 4,055 mm (159.6 in)
- Width: 1,905 mm (75.0 in)
- Height: 1,200 mm (47.2 in)
- Curb weight: 1,100 kg (2,425 lb)

The Kimera EVO37 is a restomod sports car produced by Kimera Automobili, inspired by the Lancia Rally 037. An updated version called the Kimera EVO38 was presented in 2024.

== History ==
The Rally 037 is a vehicle designed by the Italian car manufacturer Lancia for rallying. Due to homologation rules, a street legal variant was also built. A total of 257 Rally 037s were built from 1982 to 1984.

In May 2021, the Italian former rally driver Luca Betti presented a new car inspired by the original Rally 037, which, like the 037, is based on a Lancia Montecarlo. However, only the passenger cell with the chassis number came from the Montecarlo. The remaining components were newly developed. The new car, limited to 37 copies, had its public premiere at the Goodwood Festival of Speed in July 2021. Production takes place in Piedmont, Italy at Kimera Automobili. The company name comes from the Italian language and stands for the chimera, a hybrid creature from Greek mythology, which can also be seen on the manufacturer's emblem. The base price of the car before taxes initially was €400.000, but following upgrades in terms of materials and technologies used, it was gradually raised to €720.000 in 2024.

== Specifications ==
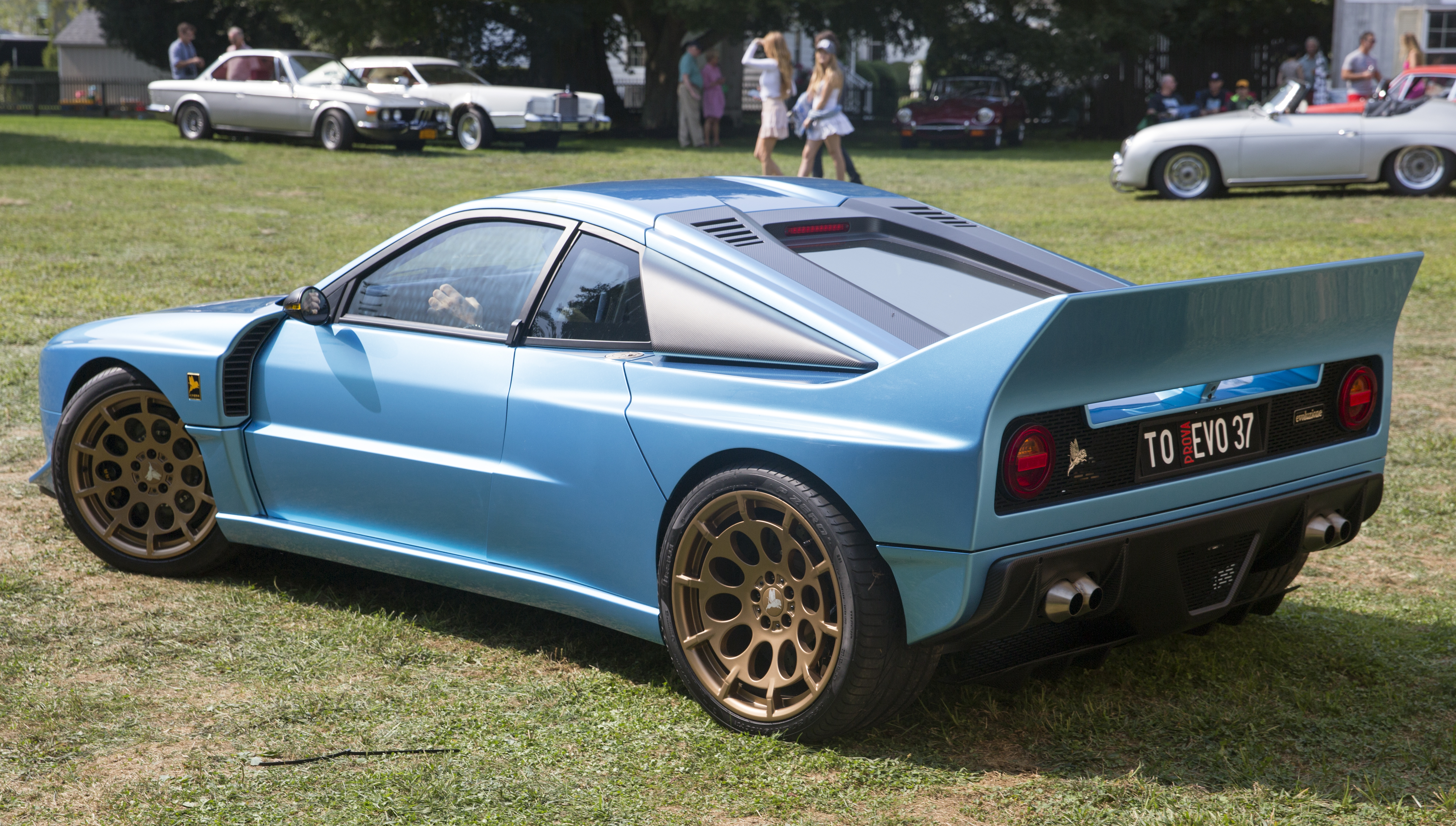
Rear view

The whole body of the EVO37 is made of carbon fiber. The suspension, with two double wishbones at the rear, was developed by Öhlins. The carbon-ceramic brake system comes from Brembo. Compared to the Rally 037, the Kimera has been modernized and better equipped. For example, it has LED lights, an anti-lock braking system, air conditioning and a camera-based interior mirror. The EVO37 has a weight of 1,100 kg (2,430 lb) and is powered by a 371 kW (505 hp) four-cylinder petrol engine with a displacement of 2150 cc, custom-made from scratch by Italtecnica. In contrast to the Rally 037, the engine of the EVO37 not only has a supercharger, but also a turbocharger for the high power ranges: this kind of engine was present in the Lancia Delta S4, the successor of the Rally 037. The car accelerates to 100 km/h (62 mph) in three seconds and has an estimated top speed of 310 km/h (193 mph). The 6-speed manual gearbox is made by Dana Graziano for Kimera Automobili. The instrument cluster is a modern interpretation of the original Lancia 037's dashboard.

Kimera Automobili gives customers the chance to customise the materials, colours, stitchings and inscriptions on the car.

== Gallery ==
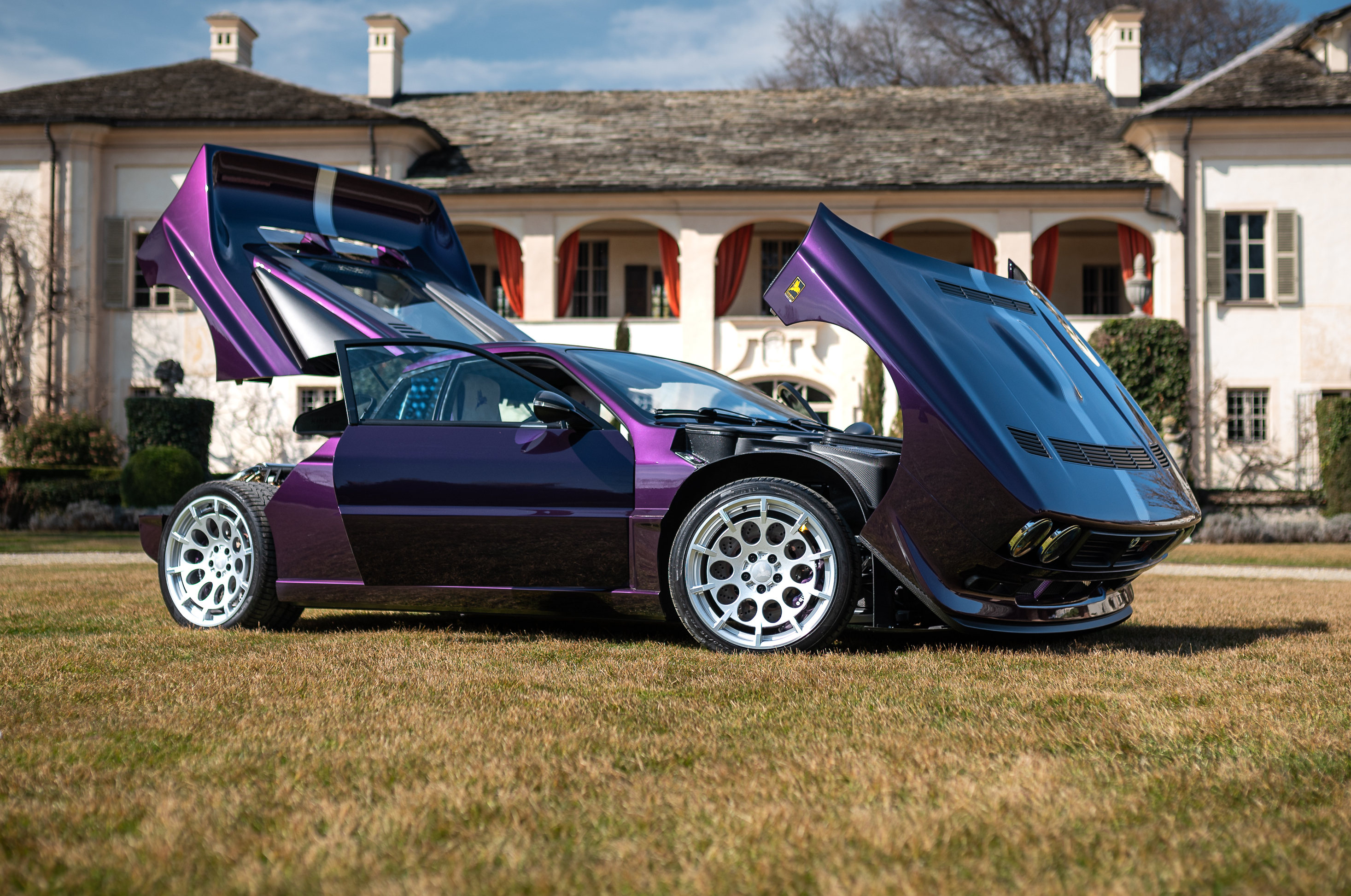
EVO37 with all of its panels opened

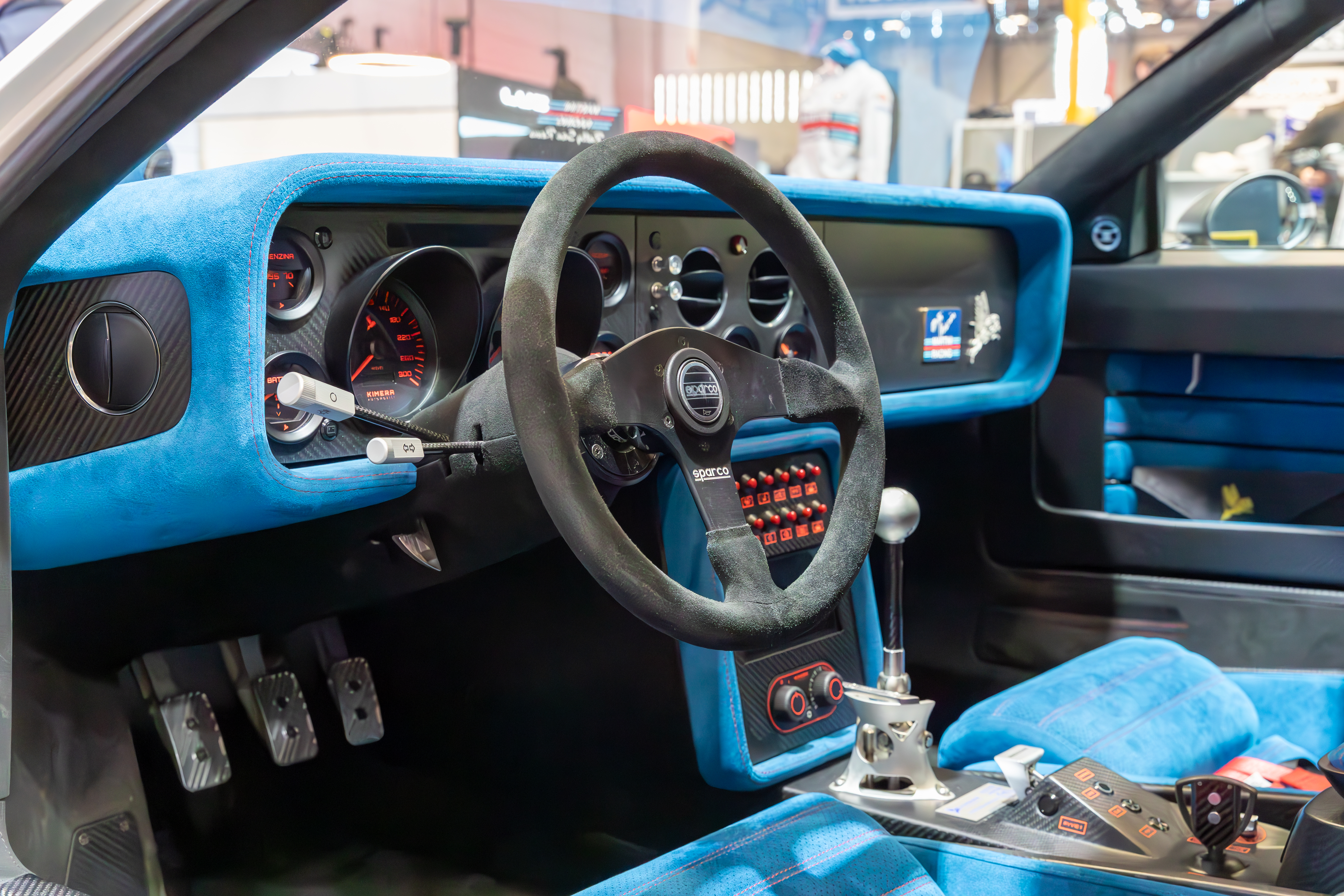
Interior

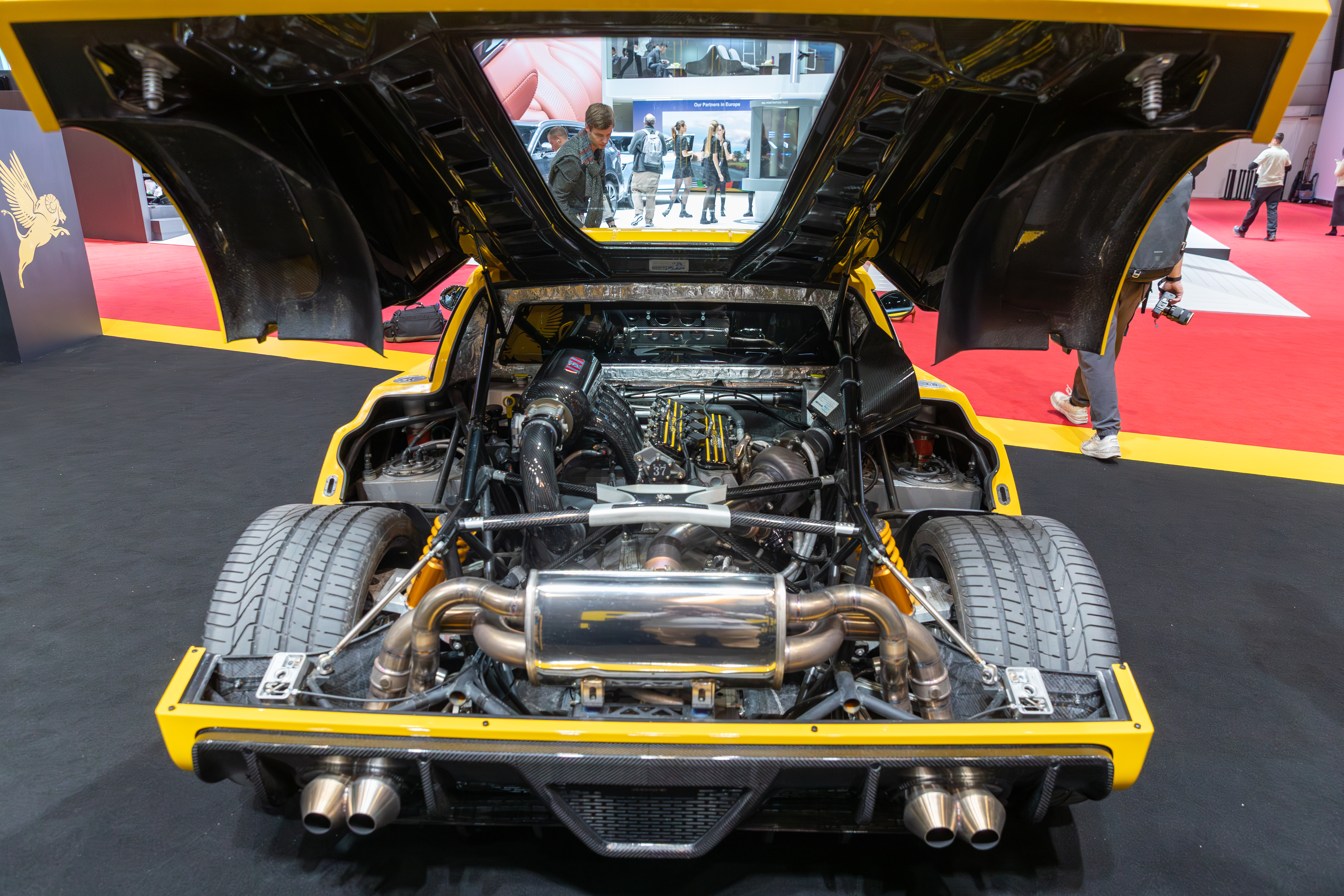
Engine
