= Unfold (Marié Digby album) =

2008 debut album by Marié Digby

Studio album by Marié Digby
- Released: April 8, 2008
- Recorded: 2006–2008
- Genre: Pop rock, alternative rock
- Length: 48:57; 62:33 (Asian edition)
- Label: Hollywood
- Producer: Dave Bassett, Mike Daly, Tom Rothrock

Marié Digby chronology
Start Here EP (2007)	Unfold (2008)	Breathing Underwater (2009)

Singles from Unfold
- 1. "Say It Again" Released: January 18, 2008

Professional ratings
Review scores
Source	Rating
AllMusic	3.5/5 stars
Billboard	(Positive)

Unfold is the debut solo album by singer/songwriter Marié Digby. The album features the singles "Umbrella" (a cover of the Rihanna hit), "Say It Again" and "Stupid for You", and was released on April 8, 2008 in the United States via Hollywood Records. The album debuted at #29 on the Billboard 200.

== Album information ==
Digby started the recording process in early 2006. She worked with producers Dave Bassett, Mike Daly, and Tom Rothrock.

Digby rode the internet video channel to a hit iTunes single, a Gap ad, and a song on Smallville. Digby's homemade videos feature her acoustic interpretations of hits by Rihanna, Linkin Park, and others - "Umbrella" being the most popular - and her debut includes more fully realized versions of those songs alongside Digby's originals.

== Track listing ==
1. "Fool" (Bruner, Digby, Graham)– 4:09
2. "Better Off Alone" (Digby)– 3:54
3. "Say It Again" (Marie Digby, Jim Dyke, Marc Nelkin, Eric Sanicola)– 3:42
4. "Miss Invisible" (Digby)– 3:52
5. "Stupid for You" (Digby)– 3:22
6. "Girlfriend" (Bruner, Digby)– 3:39
7. "Traffic" (Cutler, Digby, Preven)– 4:01
8. "Voice on the Radio" (Digby)– 4:50
9. "Spell" (Bruner, Digby)– 4:37
10. "Beauty In Walking Away" (Bassett, Digby)– 3:40
11. "Unfold" (Digby)– 5:27
12. "Umbrella" (Shawn Carter, Terius Nash, Christopher Stewart, Kuk Harrell) – 3:48
- Japanese Edition
1. "Say It Again"
2. "Better Off Alone"
3. "Traffic" (acoustic version)
4. "Girlfriend"
5. "Miss Invisible"
6. "Spell" (acoustic version)
7. "Stupid For You" (acoustic version)
8. "Voice On the Radio"
9. "Fool"
10. "Umbrella"
11. "Beauty In Walking Away"
12. "Better Off Alone" (acoustic version)
13. "Unfold"
14. "Umbrella" (acoustic version)
15. "Miss Invisible" (acoustic version)
16. "Unfold" (acoustic version)
17. "Kolewa" (Japanese hidden track) (Bruner, Digby)

Bonus Tracks:

- Wal-Mart Edition

13. "Stupid For You (Acoustic)" (Digby) - 2:53
14. "Better Off Alone (Acoustic)" (Digby) - 4:10

- iTunes Edition

13. "Beauty In Walking Away (Acoustic)" (Bassett, Digby) – 3:27
14. "Paint Me In Your Sunshine" (Digby) – 4:02

- Amazon Edition

13."Spell (Exclusive Acoustic track)" (Bruner, Digby) – 4:44

- Asian Edition

13. "Stupid For You (Acoustic)" - 2:53
14. "Better Off Alone (Acoustic)" - 4:10
15. "Say It Again (Acoustic)" - 3:34
16. "Umbrella (Acoustic)" - 3:10

== Chart performance ==
Chart	Peak position
United States Billboard 200	29
United States Digital Albums	118

=== Release details ===
Country	Date	Label	Format
United States	April 8, 2008	Hollywood Records	CD
Canada	April 22, 2008	Universal Music Group	CD
Asia	May 5, 2008	Hollywood Records/EMI	CD
Japan	August 6, 2008	Avex Group	CD

== Personnel ==
- Marié Digby – vocals, guitar, rhodes, synth, piano
- Erina Digby, Sharon Celani, Gia Ciambotti – backing vocals
- Peter Bradley Adams – keyboards
- Dave Bassett – bass, guitar
- Sasha Krivtsov - bass Sasha Krivtsov
- Matt Chait, Mike Daly, Lance Konnerth, Tom Rothrock, Mike Tarantino – guitar
- Frank Coglitore – bass
- John Nau - piano

=== Production ===
- Producers: Dave Bassett, Mike Daly, Tom Rothrock
- Mastering: Don C. Tyler
- Engineers: Karl Egsieker, Mike Tarantino
- A&R: Allison Hamamura
- Photography: Emily Shur
- Art Direction: Ryan Corey
- Design: Ryan Corey
