= Chimaera (magazine) =

British Dippy zine 1975–1983

First page of Issue 1

Chimaera was a British zine published between 1975 and 1983 that originally focused on play-by-mail games of Diplomacy. It became first British "Dippy zine" to include other play-by-mail games in its pages; those were often adapted from popular board games of the time.

== History ==
The strategic board game Diplomacy was first published in 1959. Because of its long playing time (4–12 hours), finding enough players to start and finish an entire game became an issue. In the 1960s, this led to the publication of "Dippy zines" in the United States that enabled play-by-mail games of Diplomacy.

In 1969, Don Turnbull published the first British Dippy zine, Albion, and this was followed by a large number of others. In June 1975, Clive Booth published the first edition of Chimaera as a monthly four-page spirit-duplicated Dippy zine, but stated in his introduction "I do not want Chimaera to develop into just another Diplomacy 'zine. I would like to start and play in these pages games of a different genre, in fact any game on the market that is adaptable to postal rules." Despite Booth's decision to include other games, this took some months to organize, and the first five issues only offered Diplomacy.

In Issue 6, while Booth continued to adjudicate Diplomacy games, he also started to allow other game administrators to use Chimaera for different postal games, making it first British Dippy zine to do so. The first game was Soccerboss, a football (soccer) management game, and many in the British Diplomacy community were not pleased with this choice. Many fired off letters to Booth as well as to the editors of other Dippy zines, retitling the game Soccerdross, and calling it a trivial game that required little skill because dice throws trumped strategy. Stephen Agar recalled that "Throughout 1977 zines were full of letters either supporting Soccerboss or denigrating Soccerdross." Despite this, Alan Parr noted that the game as presented in Chimaera "inspired game after game, and in the search for increasing realism the games became complex enough almost to qualify as genuine simulations." Charles Vasey commented that "[Soccerboss] is one of the few games that reads well for non-players."

Despite the controversy, Chimaera continued to feature Soccerboss, and in each of the next issues, new games appeared. As Robin Hood noted, "Clive runs Diplomacy games, but also allows anyone to run any other game that arouses player interest providing that the person making the game suggestion is prepared to run the game himself." Over the years, the list of other games included:

- a Dungeons & Dragons campaign called The Pits of Cil that lasted for 47 issues over 4 years
- Sopwith, a World War I aviation combat board game adapted to postal play (launched by Tom Tweedy as a sub-zine within Chimaera called Dib Dib Dib; Tweedy would eventually publish Dib Dib Dib as a separate zine.)
- En Garde!, the tactical dueling game published by Game Designers' Workshop
- War of the Great Jewels, a Diplomacy variant based on J.R.R. Tolkien's The Silmarillion
- Kingmaker, a postal version of the Avalon Hill game
- Railway Rivals, a postal version of the educational board game administered by the game's creator, David Watts. The game presented in Chimaera was more popular than Watt's actual board game sales to schools.
- 1829, a postal version of the popular rail-building game.
- Mastermind
- Backgammon
- Formula 1, a popular British car-racing game of the time published by Waddingtons

The zine also contained various columns about gaming, such as Booth's own description of his involvement in a game of Empire of the Petal Throne. Chimaera expanded greatly as a result of this, and by Issue 10, it was 30 pages long and had changed from spirit-duplication to mimeograph.

Chimaera was popular in the British postal game community in the late 1970s and placed highly in popularity polls. However, Booth's enthusiasm for the zine waned in the early 1980s, which was noted by critic Pete Tamlyn, who wrote, "These days Chimaera is something of a shadow of its former self [as compared to the time] when it twice won the Zine Poll." Booth ended his involvement after Issue 102 (July 1983), handing his zine over to Richard Morris, who renamed it Boojum.

== Awards ==
Chimaera won the U.K.'s 1976 "Zine Poll" after less than a year of publication. It won again in 1977, then came third in 1978 and 1979.

== Reception ==
In Issue 7 of Perfidious Albion, Charles Vasey wrote, "Every now and then one makes a discovery that makes all the trash worth it, Chimaera is such a magazine ... This really is a splendid 'zine, try a copy. It will certainly affect the way I present things in Perfidious Albion." Five issues later, Vasey assured readers "The whole magazine is very amusing, the games are well-organized and the magazine [is] regular."

In Issue 8 of Owl & Weasel, Steve Jackson and Ian Livingstone were "quite enthusiastic about [it], mainly because it's a general games zine as opposed a one~gamer. It is rapidly improving, and no.5, which we've just received, contains letters, zine reviews, humour (of sorts!), cartoons (don't line drawings really liven a mag up?) and games." Six months later, in Issue 15 of Owl & Weasel, Jackson and Livingstone revisited Chimaera and wrote, "We've always been happy to receive copies of Chimaera from Clive; it's one of the few 'games' zines (i.e. ones that run their own games) that gets read before it's filed away. It has now developed into an excellent little paper with a character of its own and apart from the useful (and useless—but-interesting) articles and comments, it actually makes you laugh!"

A 1978 poll of British gamers ranked Chimaera in second place for "Best Zine" and "Best Zine for Games Playing", and in third place for "Best Letter Column".

In Issue 45 of Diplomacy World, Alan Parr wrote, "Clive Booth's Chimaera is one of the half-dozen classic magazines of the British hobby. For most of its immensely long life (well over one hundred issues) it appeared frequently, had a famous letter column, and offered its many readers twenty or thirty pages of genuine reading matter every issue." Parr noted, "Clive wasn't a great inventor of games, but he had an enormously wide breadth of interest coupled with the vision to see how almost any game could be fruitfully offered in a postal context."

== Reviews ==
- Perfidious Albion #9 (September 1976) p.19
