= Chimera (Northern Ireland band) =

Northern Irish alternative rock band

- Chimera, 1996

Background information
- Origin: Belfast, Northern Ireland
- Genres: Indie rock
- Years active: 1990–1997
- Label: Grass Records (now Wind-up)
- Past members: Eileen Henry (vocals), Steven T. Emerson (bass), Ted Laverty (guitars), Willia Vincent (drums and percussion)

Chimera were a Northern Irish alternative rock band that saw brief, but notable fame in the mid-1990s. They have been frequently compared to The Sundays, Cocteau Twins and the Cranberries.

== History ==
Chimera was formed in 1990 and included members Eileen Henry (vocals), Steven T. Emerson (bass), Ted Laverty (guitars), and William Vincent (drums).

In 1993, Chimera released their first U.K. album, Lughnasa, but later had to buy back all of the copies due to contractual problems. That album contained two singles, "Ellis Bleeds" and "Cyan Daze".

They were highly praised in their early years by the UK press, earning UK's NME "Single of the Week" award. Because of that award, record producer Chris Nagle began working with the band. Nagle had previously worked with bands such as Echo & the Bunnymen, Joy Division, New Order, and the Smiths.

Chimera's U.S. debut was 1995's Day Star EP, released on Grass Records (now Wind-up). The release contained four songs, and some would later be rerecorded for 1996's Earth Loop, their only full-length album released in the United States. Following the release of Earth Loop, Chimera spent most of 1996 in the U.S. touring. They performed with many popular alternative bands, including the Sneaker Pimps, Blur, the Pixies, and Throwing Muses. That year the single, "Catch Me," garnered modest airplay on some U.S. alternative radio stations.

== Members ==
- Eileen Henry (vocals)
- Steven T. Emerson (bass)
- Ted Laverty (guitars)
- William Vincent (drums and percussion)
- Anthony Monaghan (live guitar)

== Albums/EPs ==
- Lughnasa (1993 - UK only)
- Day Star EP (1995)
- Earth Loop (1996)
