= Marié Digby =

American musician

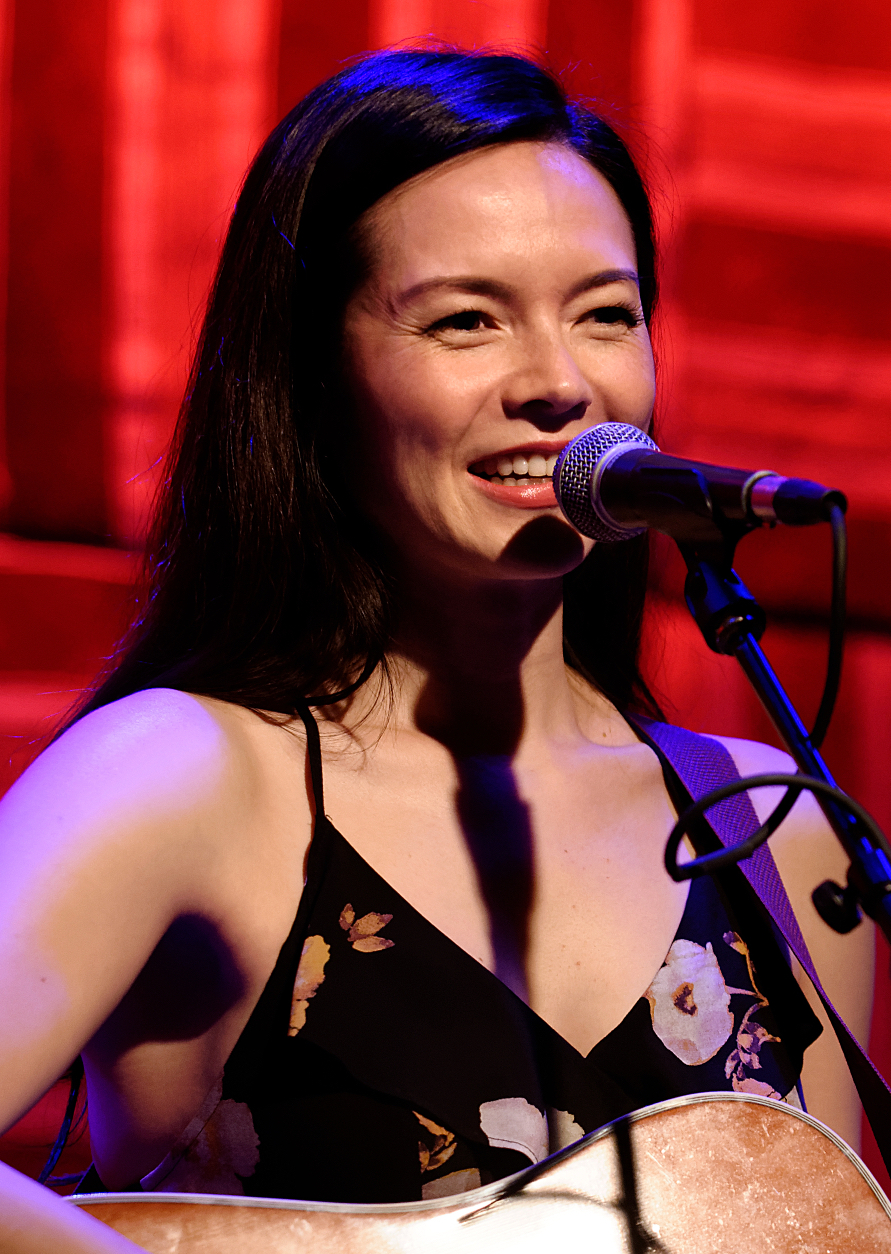
- Marié Digby in 2016

Background information
- Born: Marié Christina Digby; April 16, 1983 (age 43); Los Angeles, California, U.S.
- Genres: Pop rock; alternative rock; acoustic rock; R&B
- Occupations: Singer; musician; songwriter
- Instruments: Vocals; guitar; piano
- Years active: 2004–present
- Labels: Hollywood; Avex Trax; Star

YouTube information
- Channel: MarieDigby
- Years active: 2004–present
- Genre: Music
- Subscribers: 346 thousand
- Views: 136 million
- Last updated: April 25, 2021

Marié Christina Digby (/ˌmɑːriˈeɪ/ MAR-ee-AY; born April 16, 1983) is an American singer-songwriter best known for her acoustic cover version of Rihanna's "Umbrella", which was featured on the MTV show The Hills and peaked at #10 on the Bubbling Under Hot 100 Singles chart.

Her debut album, Unfold, was released on April 8, 2008. Digby has since released several studio albums, EPs and singles, including one Japanese cover album.

== Life and career ==
=== 1983–2005: Early life ===
Digby was born in Los Angeles, California and is of Irish and Japanese descent. She began writing songs during high school in Los Angeles, California. After her freshman year at the University of California, Berkeley, she won the 2004 Pantene Pro-Voice competition with her song "Miss Invisible". The grand prize for the concert included working with a professional producer on an album, $5,000 and performing on stage with other top performers. Digby subsequently signed with Disney's Hollywood Records.

=== 2006–2010: Unfold, Second Home, and Breathing Underwater ===
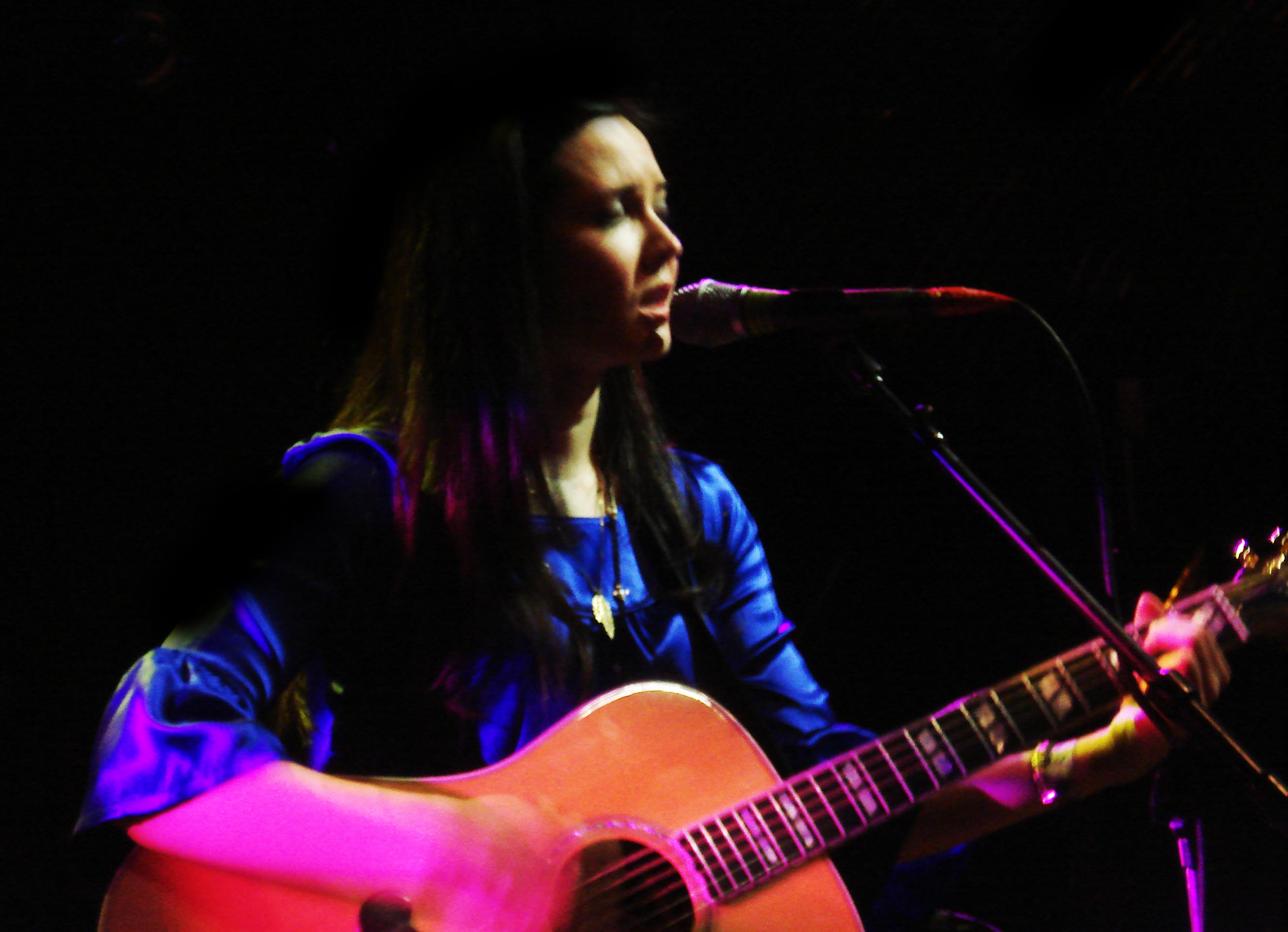
Marié Digby at The Troubadour nightclub in Los Angeles in 2007

In 2006, she completed her debut album, but its release was postponed. The same year, her song "Fool" was included on the Disney compilation album Girl Next. In early 2007, she began to post simple videos of herself singing cover songs of other artists on YouTube in order to gain visibility. Hollywood Records then released a studio recording of her rendition of "Umbrella" to iTunes and radio stations. Digby's first official single, "Say It Again", was released to radio stations on January 18, 2008. Her debut album, Unfold, was released on April 8, 2008.

Digby released a Japan-exclusive collection of Japanese cover songs on March 4, 2009, titled Second Home. Digby's second English album, Breathing Underwater, was released across Asia in summer 2009 and in North America in September 2009.

=== 2011–present: Your Love, Winter Fields, and Pop Covers ===
On September 16, 2011, she released the album Your Love. In 2012, Digby did an Asian tour for the album, including shows in Singapore and the Philippines. Her Singapore live show was held on October 18, 2012 at the Esplanade Concert Hall. In August 2012, she shared that she was preparing for her first independent album in 2013.

Digby released the song "Neon Rain" in February 2013, and also released duet singles including "Falling for You", a duet with JayR, and "The Keeper", a duet with Kina Grannis. Her fifth studio album Winter Fields was released on October 29, 2013. She also conducted regular live shows on the Stageit platform on a Pay What You Can ticketing basis.

In December 2015, Digby released the song "Jet Streams" as a free download on Bandcamp. She also independently released a remake of "Have Yourself A Merry Little Christmas".

On February 9, 2018, Digby independently released the EP Wildfire. On June 22, 2018, Digby released the album Pop Covers. It includes ten covers of popular songs.

== Charitable involvement ==
In 2009, she sponsored a songwriting contest for Bronx teenagers through "The Generation Project", a non-profit organization that facilitates donor-designed charitable gifts to children in low-income areas. The winner of the contest—a special education student from the Bronx—received a new guitar with accessories.

== Discography ==
- Unfold (2008)
- Second Home (2009)
- Breathing Underwater (2009)
- Your Love (2011)
- Winter Fields (2013)
- Chimera (2014)
- Wildfire EP (2018)
- Pop Covers (2018)

== Songs in other media ==
Year	Title	Type	Song
2005	The Dive From Clausen's Pier	Film	"Where Do I Go?"
2007	The Hills	TV series episode: "You Know What You Did"	"Umbrella"
2007	Holiday in Handcuffs	Film music bed	"Bring Me Love"
2007	Smallville	TV series episode: "Wrath" & “Cure”	"Spell"
2007	Smallville	TV series episode: "Wrath"	"Unfold"
2008	ER	TV series episode: "The Chicago Way"	"Say It Again"
2008	Gap	TV ad: "Sound of Color" Campaign	"Paint Me In Your Sunshine"
2008	Greek	TV series episode: "Barely Legal"	"Better Off Alone"
2008	The Hills	TV series episode: "When Spencer Finds Out..."	"Beauty in Walking Away"
2008	Smallville	TV series episode: "Fracture"	"Say It Again"
2009	90210	TV series episode: "A Trip to the Moon"	"Love with a Stranger"
2009	Greek	TV series episode: "Our Fathers"	"Breathing Underwater"
2009	The City	TV series episode: "I'm Sorry, Whit"	"Breathing Underwater"
2009	The Hills	TV series episode: "I'm Done With You"	"Avalanche"
2009	Lincoln Heights	TV series promo	"Avalanche"
2009	One Life to Live	TV series promo	"Come to Life"
2010	The Hills	TV series episode: "All Good Things..."	"Symphony"
2011	Vanished With Beth Holloway	TV series promo	"Feel"

== Awards and nominations ==
Year	Award	Nominated work	Category	Result
2004	Pantene Pro-Voice Competition	"Miss Invisible"	Entrant	Won
2009	Teen Music Internacional - Brazil	Herself	Best New Artist	Won
2009	Teen Music Internacional - Brazil	"Say It Again"	Best Female Pop Vocal Performance	Nominated
