= Say It Again (Marié Digby song) =

Single by Marié Digby

from the album Unfold
- Released: January 18, 2008
- Recorded: 2006
- Genre: Pop rock
- Length: 3:42
- Label: Hollywood
- Songwriters: Marié Digby, Jim Dyke, Marc Nelkin, Eric Sanicola

Marié Digby singles chronology
"Bring Me Love" (2007)	"Say It Again" (2008)	"Stupid For You" (2008)

"Say It Again" is the first single of Marie Digby's debut album Unfold. It was released to radio on January 18, 2008, and on iTunes on February 19, 2008. The song was promoted by its appearance on television series Smallville and by the creation of three music videos.

== Music videos ==
Three music videos have been made for the song.

The first video was filmed by Digby's sisters and a friend. It features her singing and playing the guitar on Venice Beach. The video was first released via Digby's YouTube channel on June 22, 2007, but not made public until Jan 25, 2008.

The second video, released only in some parts of Asia, featured Digby performing the song acoustically in Capitol Studio.

The third and official video premiered on Digby's YouTube channel on May 22, 2008. It shows her in what is presumably a movie studio, with different backdrops and props appearing behind her while she sings, plays her guitar and plays the piano. In the video's description, Digby states:

This is my official video for Say It Again!! I had so much fun shooting this video and I loved the props so much that I took a few of them home with me! I really hope you enjoy watching this ... :) At the end you will notice a rollerskating tree - interesting note is that I almost lost my head during one of the takes... Too bad that was edited out.. ;)

== Track listing ==
=== Promo CD single ===
1. "Say It Again" – 3:44

=== Other version ===
1. "Say It Again (Acoustic)" – 3:34

== Promotion ==
"Say It Again" was featured in some episodes of Smallville. The song is the closing theme for season 7, episode 12, "Fracture". In a later episode, it is revealed that the song is the favourite of Kara.

== Charts ==
Chart (2008)	Peak position
South Korea (Gaon International Digital Chart)	28
US Adult Pop Airplay (Billboard)	21

== Release history ==
Region	Date	Format	Label	Ref.
United States	January 28, 2008	Hot adult contemporary radio	Hollywood	
