= Concorso d'Eleganza Villa d'Este =

Concours d'Elegance for vintage cars

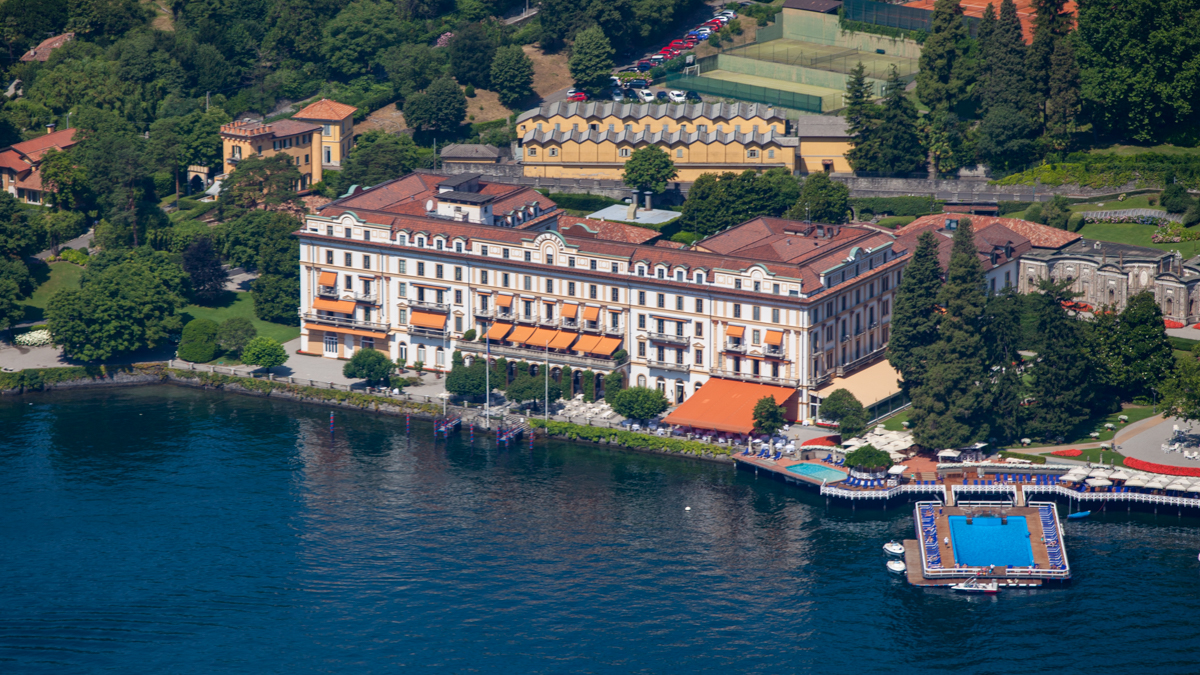
- Genre: Concours d'Elegance
- Frequency: Annually
- Locations: Cernobbio, Italy
- Inaugurated: 1 September 1929; 97 years ago
- Previous event: 23–25 May 2025
- Next event: 15-17 May 2026
- Sponsor: BMW Group
- Website: concorsodeleganzavilladeste.com

Concorso d'Eleganza Villa d'Este (Italian for 'Competition of Elegance of Villa d'Este') is a Concours d'Elegance event in Italy for classic and vintage cars. It takes place annually near the Villa d'Este hotel in Cernobbio, on the western shore of Lake Como in northern Italy. Since 2011, the event has taken place in the second half of May.

BMW Group has organised the event, jointly with the Villa d'Este hotel, since 2009. Visitors can admire about fifty cars, all built between the 1920s and the 1970s, organized in different categories.

Car makers also take advantage of the event to showcase some of their upcoming models. For example, a working Aston Martin One-77 was officially unveiled to the press during the 2009 event.

== Winners ==
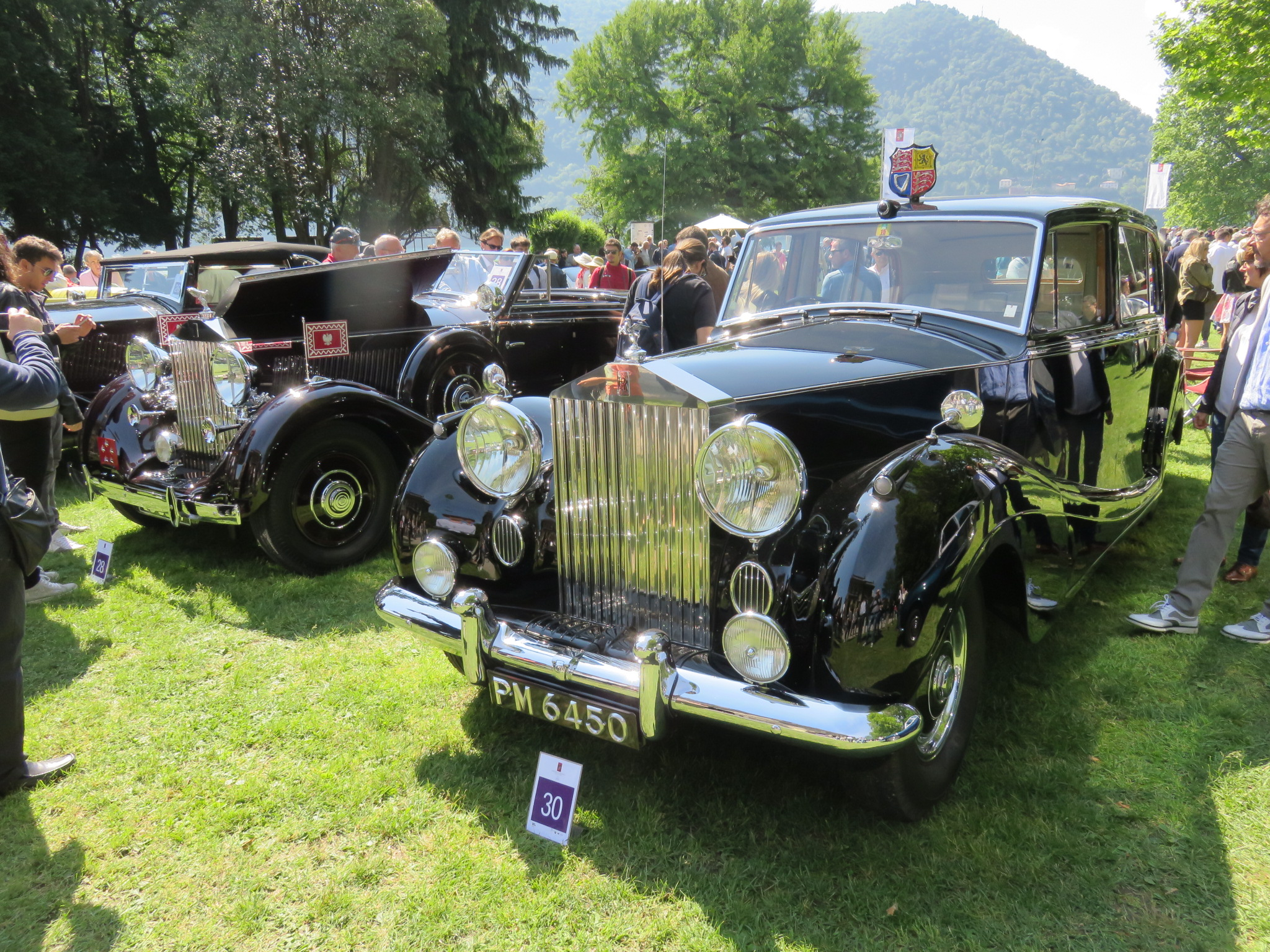
Photo of a Rolls-Royce Phantom IV, built in 1954 for Princess Margaret, exhibited alongside other vehicles at the show in May 2015

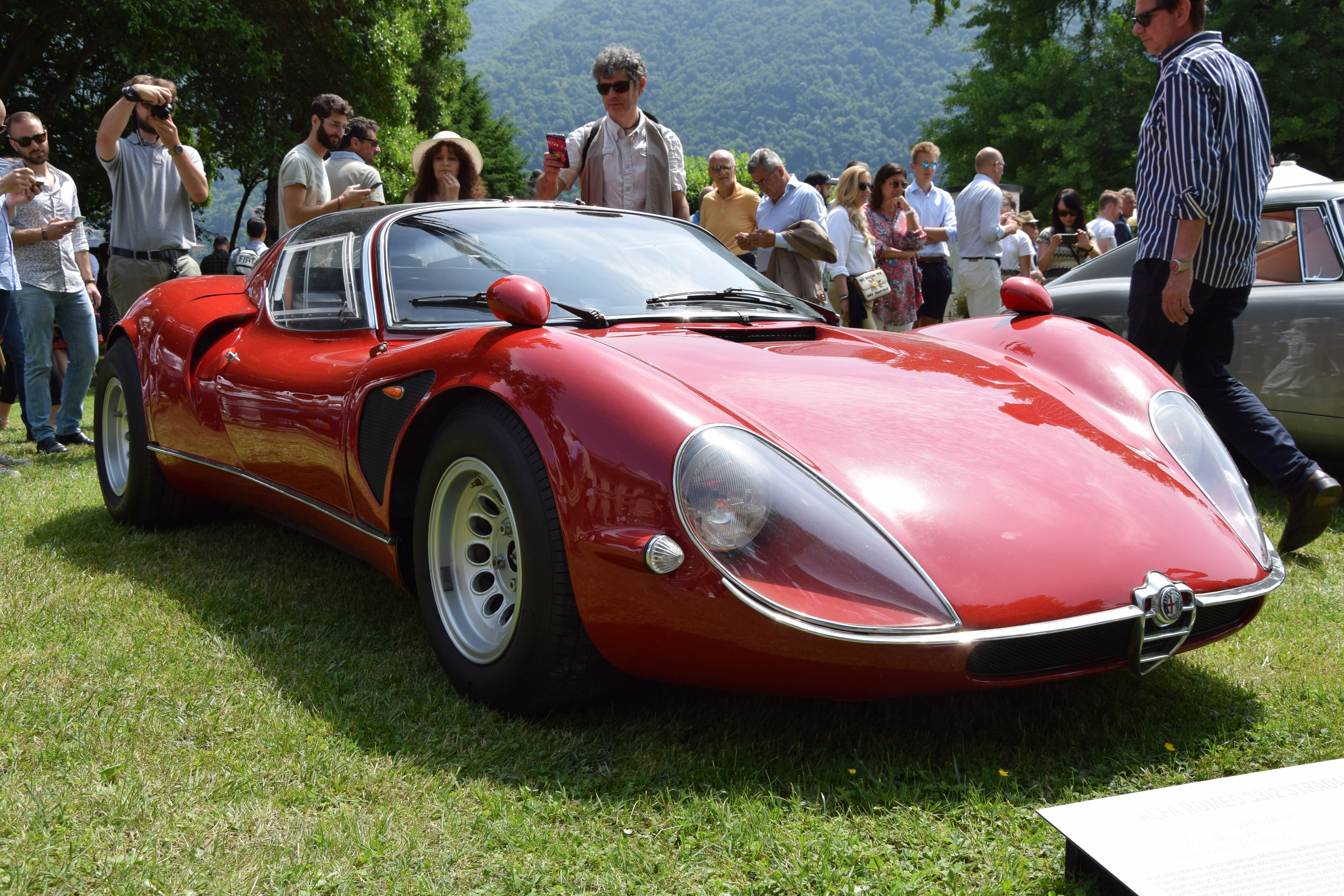
A 1968 Alfa Romeo 33-2 Stradale, winner of the 2018 Coppa d'Oro

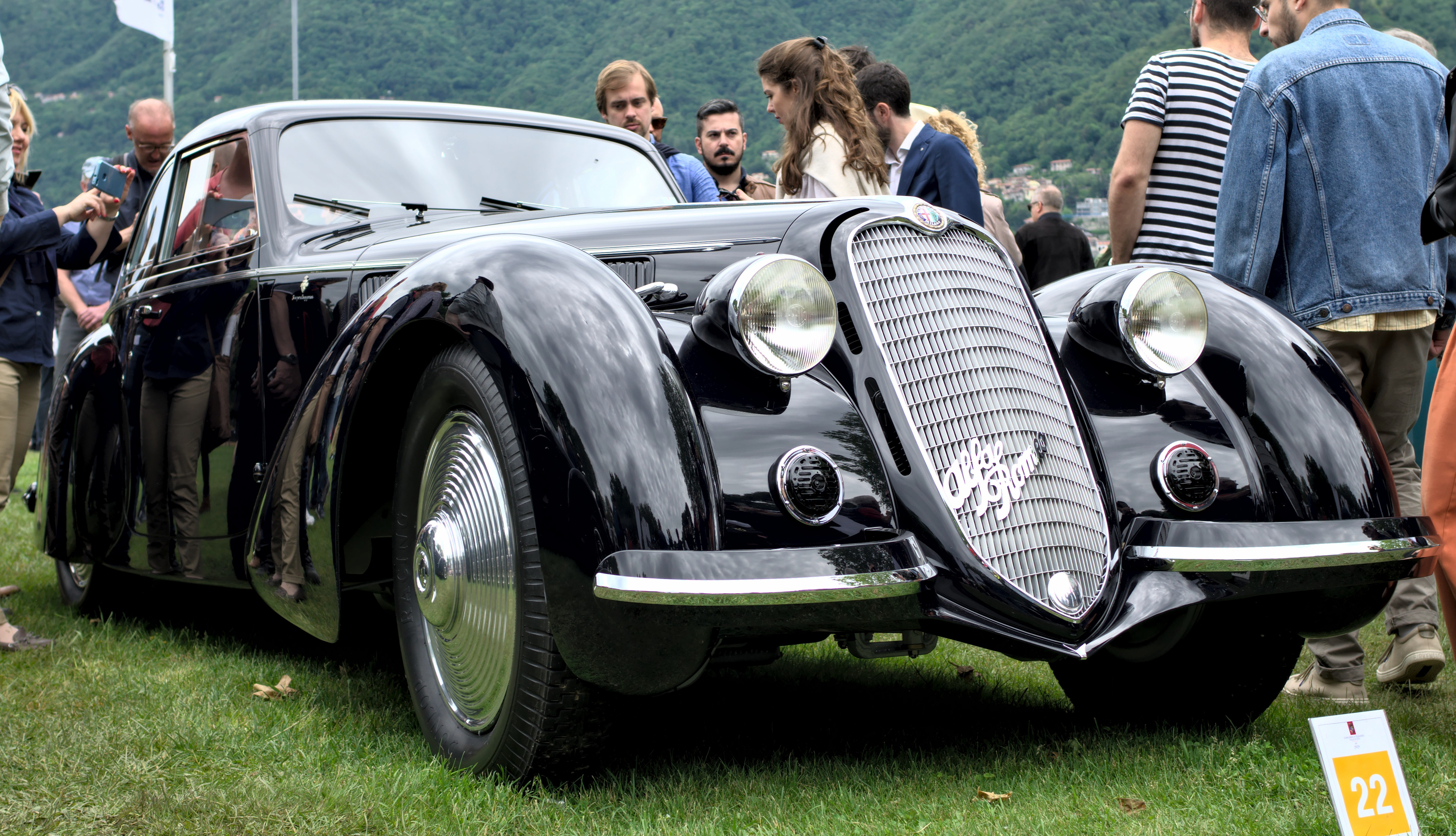
A 1937 Alfa Romeo 8C 2900B, winner of the 2019 Coppa d'Oro

Historic cars					Concept cars and prototypes
Date	Year	Coppa d’Oro Villa d’Este	Trofeo BMW Group	Trofeo BMW Group Italia	Concorso d’Eleganza Design Award
26–27 April 2008	2008	1938 Mercedes-Benz 540K Autobahn-Kurier Coupé	1949 Ferrari 166MM Touring Berlinetta	1937 Delahaye 135M Figoni & Falaschi Roadster	2008 Bugatti Veyron 16.4 Fbg par Hermès
24–26 April 2009	2009	1938 Alfa Romeo 8C 2900B Touring Berlinetta	1938 Alfa Romeo 8C 2900B Touring Berlinetta	1938 Alfa-Romeo 8C 2900B Touring Berlinetta	2009 Aston Martin Lagonda One-77
23–25 April 2010	2010	1955 Maserati A6GCS Frua Spider	1938 Talbot-Lago T150C-SS Figoni & Falaschi Teardrop Coupé	1938 Talbot-Lago T150C-SS Figoni & Falaschi Teardrop Coupé	2010 Zagato Alfa Romeo TZ3 Corsa
20–22 May 2011	2011	1942 Alfa Romeo 6C 2500SS Bertone Coupé	1968 Alfa Romeo 33 Stradale Scaglione Berlinetta	1968 Alfa Romeo 33 Stradale Scaglione Berlinetta	2011 Aston Martin V12 Zagato
25–27 May 2012	2012	1933 Alfa Romeo 6C 1750GS Figoni Coupé	1933 Alfa Romeo 6C 1750GS Figoni Coupé	1933 Alfa Romeo 6C 1750GS Figoni Coupé	2011 Alfa Romeo 4C Concept
24–26 May 2013	2013	1938 Bugatti 57SC Atlantic Coupé	1938 Bugatti 57SC Atlantic Coupé	1938 Bugatti 57SC Atlantic Coupé	2013 Alfa Romeo Disco Volante Touring Superleggera
23–25 May 2014	2014	1931 Alfa Romeo 6C 1750GS Zagato Aprile Spider	1956 Maserati 450S Fantuzzi Roadster	1931 Alfa Romeo 6C 1750GS Zagato Aprile Spider	2014 Maserati Alfieri
22–24 May 2015	2015	1950 Ferrari 166MM Touring Barchetta	1932 Alfa Romeo 8C 2300 Zagato Spider	1950 Ferrari 166MM Touring Barchetta	2015 Bentley EXP 10 Speed Six
20–22 May 2016	2016	1933 Lancia Astura Series II Castagna Berlinetta	1954 Maserati A6GCS Pininfarina Berlinetta	1971 Lamborghini Miura P400SV Bertone Coupé	
26–28 May 2017	2017	1935 Lurani Nibbio Riva Roadster	1957 Alfa Romeo Giulietta Sprint Speciale Bertone Prototipo	1957 Alfa Romeo Giulietta Sprint Speciale Bertone Prototype	
25–27 May 2018	2018	1968 Alfa Romeo 33-2 Stradale Scaglione Coupé	1958 Ferrari 335 Sport Scaglietti Spider	1968 Alfa Romeo 33-2 Stradale Scaglione Coupé	
24–26 May 2019	2019	1937 Alfa Romeo 8C 2900B Berlinetta Touring	1937 Alfa Romeo 8C 2900B Berlinetta Touring	1938 Lancia Astura Serie IV Cabriolet Pininfarina	2019 Bugatti La Voiture Noire
	2020	Event canceled due to COVID-19 pandemic.			
1–3 October 2021	2021	1930 Lancia Dilambda Serie I 227 Carlton Carriage	1956 Ferrari 250 GT TDF (Tour de France)	1935 Fiat 508 CS “Balilla Aerodinamica”	2019 Pininfarina Battista
20–22 May 2022	2022	1980 Aston Martin Bulldog	1937 Bugatti 57 S Vanvooren		
19–21 May 2023	2023	1961 Ferrari 250 Gran Turismo Spyder California			
24–26 May 2024	2024				
23–25 May 2025	2025				
15-17 May 2026	2026	1963 Mercedes-Benz 300 SL Roadster	1937 BMW 328 "Bügelfalte"		2026 Kimera K-39
