= Chimera (software library) =

Chimera is a software library created as a research project at UCSB for the C programming language that implements a structured, peer-to-peer routing platform to allow the easy development of peer-to-peer applications.

The project's focus is on providing a fast, lightweight implementation of a system like other prefix-routing protocols such as UCSB's Tapestry system and Microsoft Research's Pastry system, that can be easily used to build an application that creates an overlay network with a limited number of library calls. The library is intended to serve as both a usable complete structured peer-to-peer system and a starting point for further research. It includes some of the current work in locality optimization and soft-state operations.

The system contains both a leaf set of neighbor nodes, which provides fault tolerance and a probabilistic invariant of constant routing progress, and a PRR-style routing table to improve routing time to a logarithmic factor of network size.

Chimera is currently being used in industry labs, as part of research done by the U.S. Department of Defense, and by startup companies.
