= Kimera Automobili =

Italian automotive company

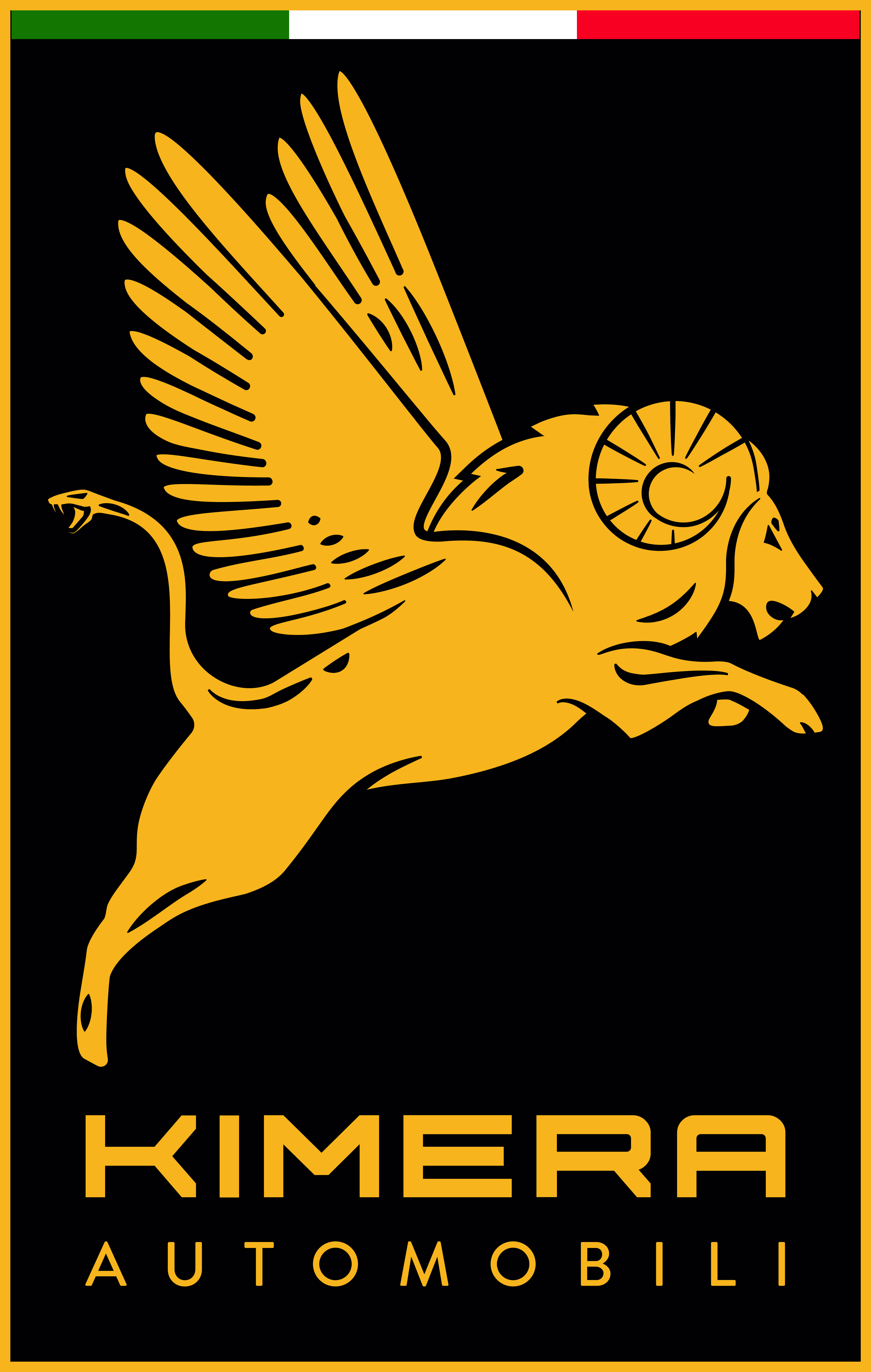

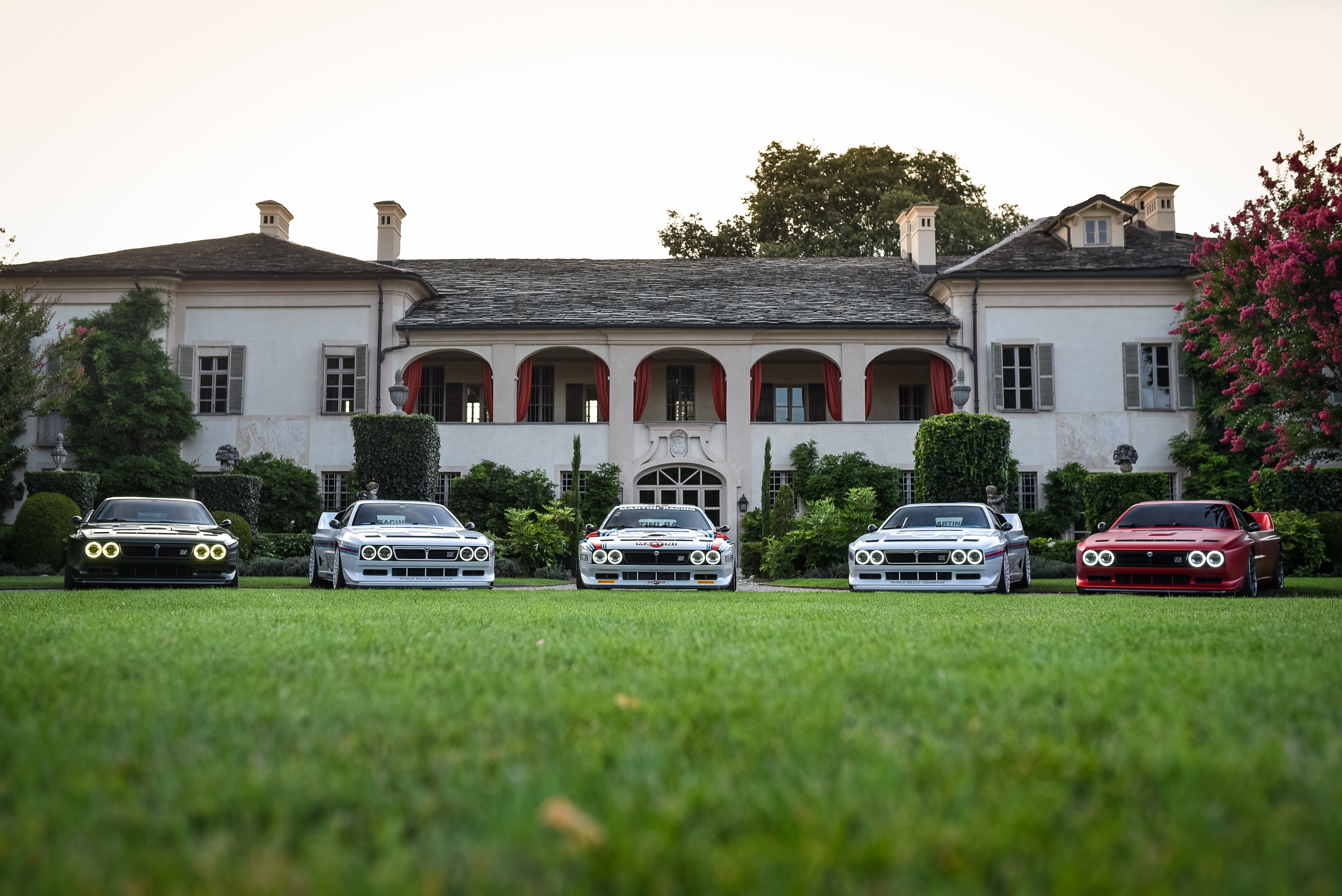
- Kimera cars at Villa Kimera
- Type: Private
- Industry: Automotive
- Founded: 2021
- Founder: Luca Betti
- Headquarters: Cuneo, Italy
- Area served: Worldwide
- Products: Automobiles
- Website: www.kimera-automobili.com

Kimera Automobili is an Italian company specializing in the production of restomods and high-performance cars. Founded by former rally driver Luca Betti, the company reinterprets iconic cars from the past by combining classic design with modern technologies. It is based in Villa Kimera, in Cuneo, Italy.

== History ==
The company name comes from the Greek language and stands for the Chimera, a hybrid creature from Greek mythology. It can also be seen on the manufacturer's emblem. More over, the letters K-M-R have a special place in Luca Betti's heart, since they stand for a sentence he always repeated to himself during his rallying career: Keeping My Road. Kimera Automobili was established with the goal of paying tribute to the Italian rally cars of the 1980s. The company's first project, launched in 2021, was the EVO37, a modern reinterpretation of the Lancia 037. The EVO name derives from the Lancia Delta HF Integrale Evoluzione from the contraction of the word "Evoluzione".

== Models ==
=== EVO37 ===
Lancia Kimera EVO37 – Autentica Evoluzione

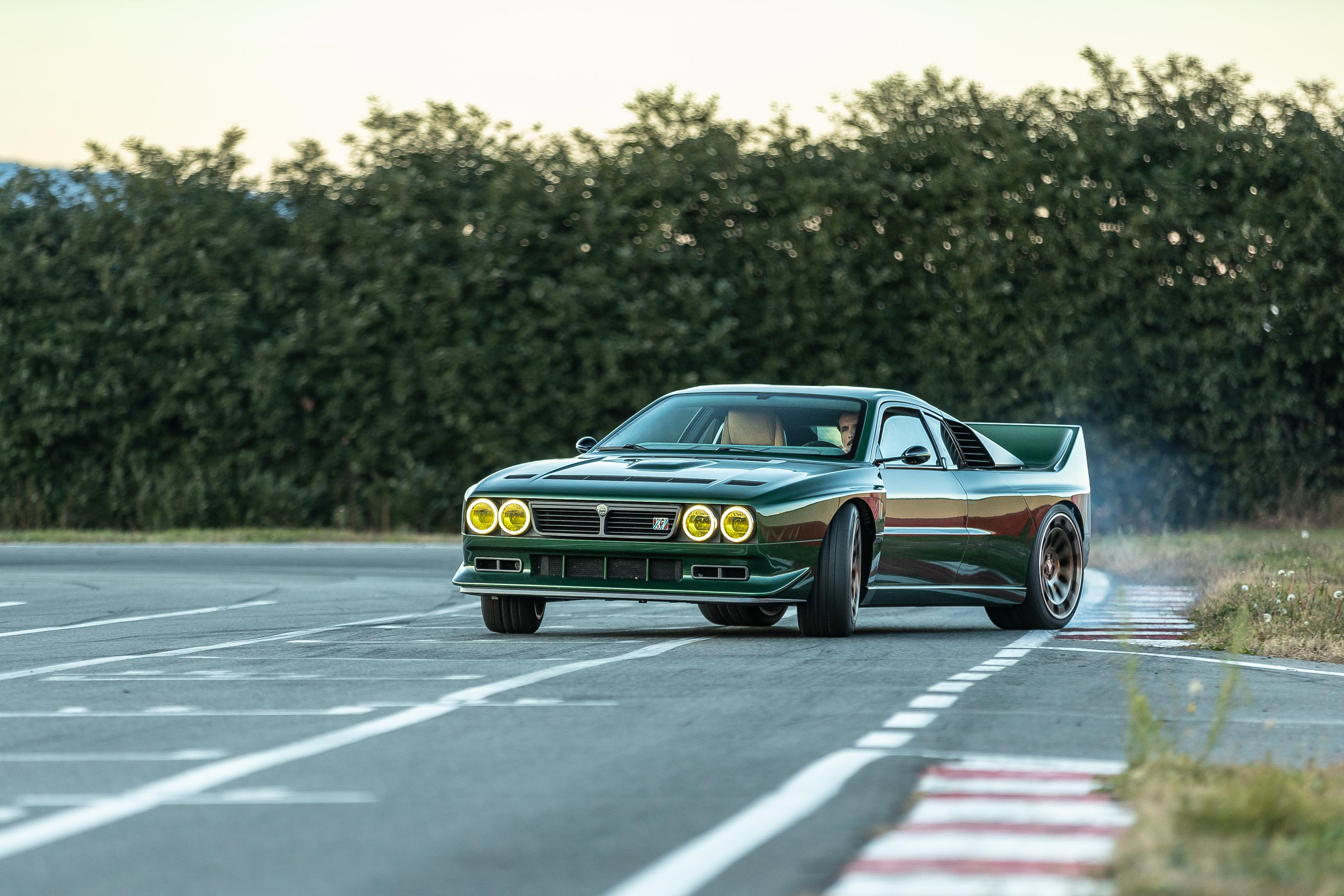
Kimera EVO37 on track

The EVO37 is a reinterpretation of the Lancia Rally 037, the last rear-wheel-drive car to win the World Rally Championship. Kimera Automobili collaborated with former Lancia engineers and technicians like Sergio Limone and Claudio Lombardi to create a limited series of 37 units, combining classic aesthetics with cutting-edge components and technologies.

The EVO37 is effectively a restomod: in order to build it, Kimera Automobili has to source and buy a donor car, a Lancia Beta Montecarlo, and use its chassis as a base. The old chassis is cut and only parts of the central shell are kept. Afterwards, a tubular chassis is built at the front and at the back, just like Lancia used to do for the Rally 037. The chassis number is also preserved on the newly built car, and for this reason a Lancia badge is kept at the front.

The EVO37 is equipped with a 2.15-liter, 4-cylinder engine capable of delivering 505 hp, owing to the combination of a supercharger (for low revs) and a turbocharger (for high revs). The engine was designed and engineered by Italtecnica with various tributes to the Italian Group B cars from the 80's. The engine capacity is the same as the Lancia 037, while the twin-charging system (supercharger + turbocharger) is the same as the Lancia Delta S4.

The engine is coupled to a 6-speed manual gearbox from Dana Graziano.

The car features a carbon fiber body, Öhlins suspension (with double wishbone dampers at the back), and a Brembo braking system.

Each EVO37 is highly customised, as Kimera Automobili gives customers hundreds of customisation options: materials, colours and stitchings can be fully personalised. Each EVO37 car also has its own name (always a female name) chosen by the owner.

=== EVO37 – Martini Racing 7 – Limited Edition ===
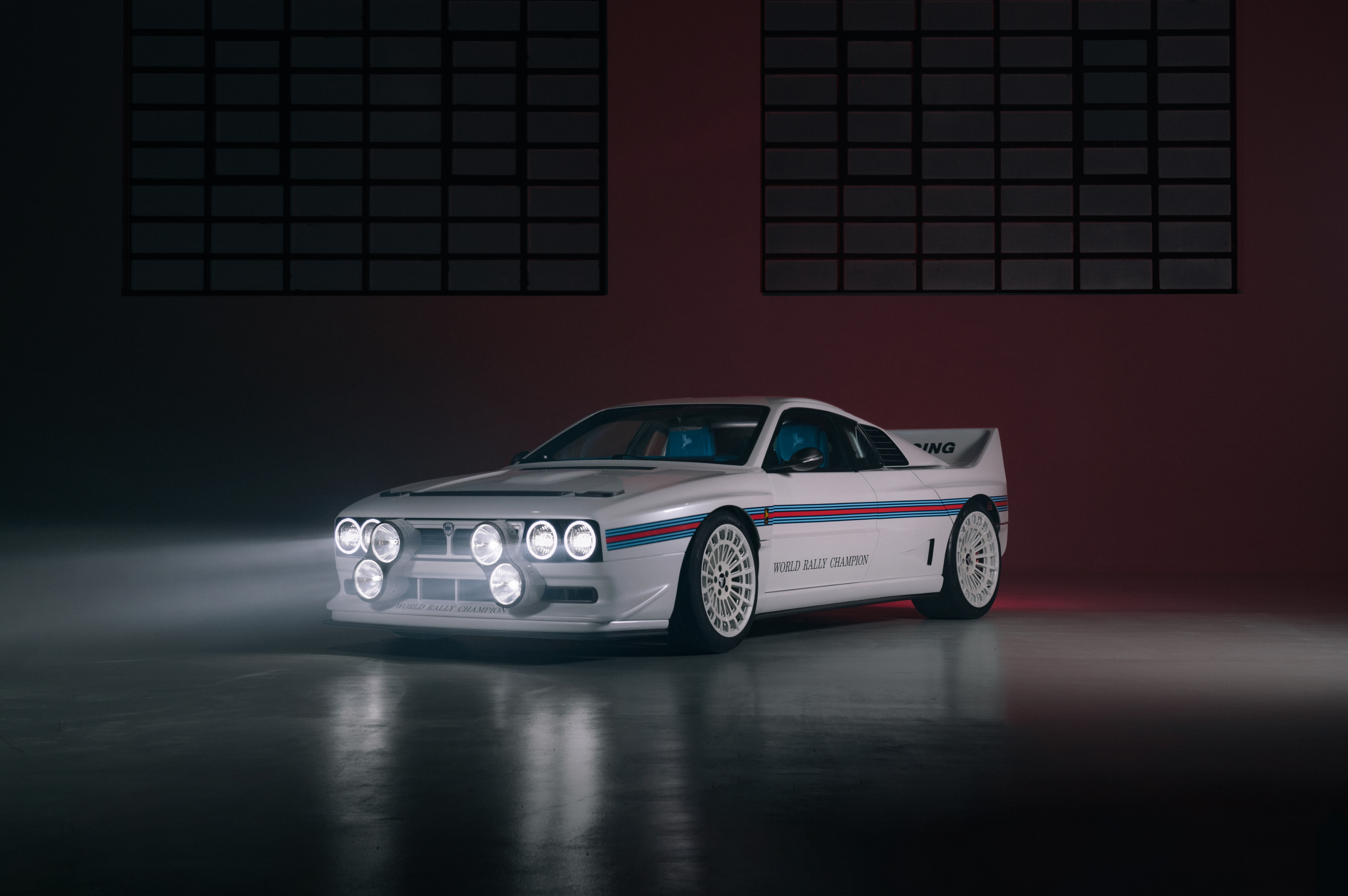
Kimera EVO37 - Martini Racing 7 - Limited Edition

Lancia Kimera EVO37 – Autentica Evoluzione – Martini Racing 7 – Limited Edition

The EVO37 Martini Racing 7 Limited Edition is a limited series of 10 units paying tribute to the Martini Racing rallying heritage, revealed in April 2023 in Sardinia by Kimera Automobili. Named Martini Racing 7 edition to celebrate the 7 World Rally Championship titles won by the Martini Racing team. These 10 unique pieces are all named after the rallies in which the Lancia Rally 037 took part, and they all wear an official and certified Martini Racing livery.

The EVO37 Martini Racing 7 Limited Edition has an increased amount of power: 550 hp, so 45 more than the standard EVO37. The car was also tuned and perfected together with Italian WRC legend Miki Biasion. Moreover, it comes with different sideskirts, a more aggressive front splitter, additional headlights and little aerodynamic tweaks like the iconic NACA air intake.

=== EVO38 ===
Lancia Kimera EVO38 – Ultima Evoluzione

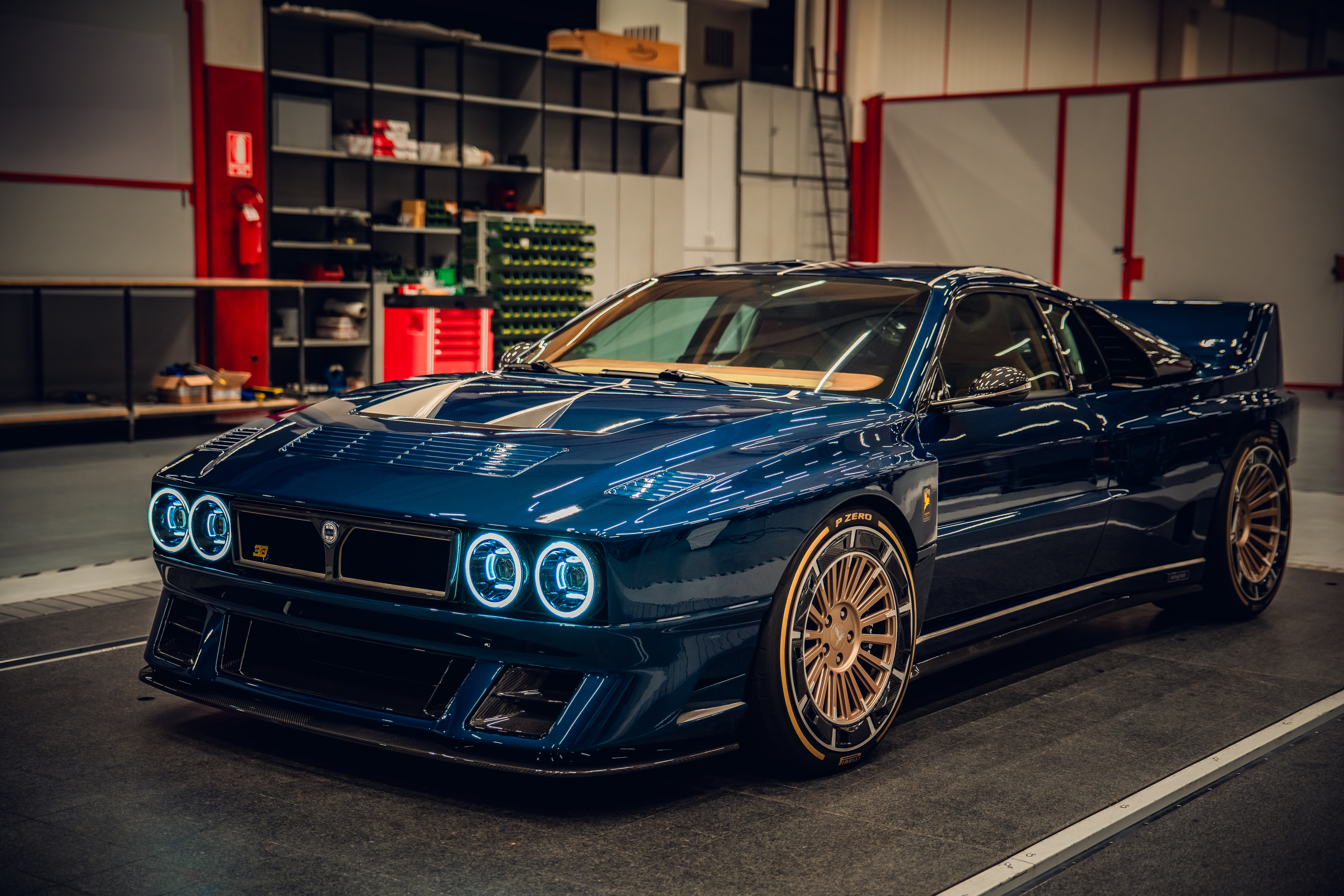
Kimera EVO38

In 2024, at the Geneva Motorshow Kimera Automobili unveiled the EVO38 ("Ultima Evoluzione", Last Evolution), the successor of the EVO37 ("Autentica Evoluzione", Authentic Evolution) which will be produced in 38 units.

The EVO38, unlike the EVO37, comes with a four-wheel drive system together with a significant increase in power, pushing out 600 hp from the reworked 2.15-liter 4-cylinder twin-charged engine. The EVO38 exhaust system ("KSD", Kimera Scarico Diretto) is radically different from the EVO37: the driver can choose between two lateral exhaust exits and a single direct and central one, which is for track use only. The EVO38 is equipped with a push-rod suspension system both at the front and at the back with the possibility to raise and lower the whole car through an HLS system. In the interior, the EVO38 is full of new quirks and details: the main one is the exposed transmission shaft, which can be seen spinning through the plexiglass cover when the car is rolling in gear.

=== K39 ===
Kimera K39 – Sky's the limit – Martini Racing

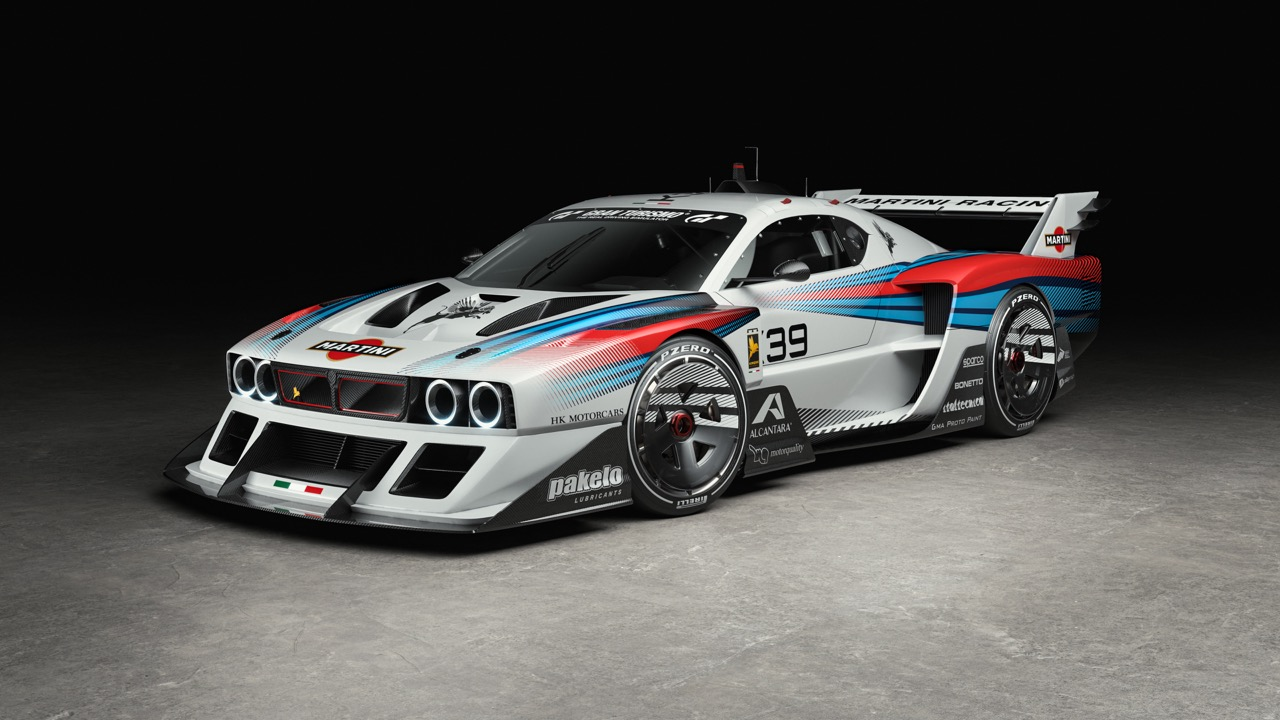
Kimera K39

In 2025, the company introduced the K39, a race car designed to compete in such events as the Pikes Peak International Hill Climb. The K39 is inspired by the "Silhouette" Lancia Beta Turbo Gr. 5 from the Martini Racing team, which dominated the World Sportscar Championship between the late 1970s and early 1980s. Its name reflects its nature as a retro-inspired new car (not EVO39 but K39, as in "Kimera 39") and not a Restomod. For this reason the K39 no longer bears the Lancia logo but the Kimera one, being a fully developed and not derived car. The car features a carbon fiber monocoque chassis and an aerodynamically optimised body designed for hill climb competitions.

== Event participation ==
Kimera Automobili constantly participates in international automotive events, showcasing its creations at venues such as the Goodwood Festival of Speed and the Monterey Car Week.

In 2025, Kimera Automobili returned to Goodwood Festival of Speed and featured their Kimera EVO38 PROTOTIPO 01 in the hill climb event.

In May 2026, the Kimera K-39 participated in the Concorso d'Eleganza Villa d'Este where it won the prize in the Concept Cars & Prototypes category.
