= Breathing Underwater (album) =

Studio album by Marié Digby
- Released: June 24, 2009
- Recorded: November 2008 – April 2009
- Genres: Pop, R&B, techno, adult alternative
- Length: 48:35; 62:52 (Japan version)
- Label: Hollywood
- Producers: Allison Hamamura, Oak Felder, Ezekiel Lewis, Brian Kennedy Seals, Pop Wansel, Antwoine "T-Wiz" Collins, The Movement, Madd Scientist

Marié Digby chronology
Second Home (2008)	Breathing Underwater (2009)	Your Love (2011)

Alternative covers
- Japanese cover

Singles from Breathing Underwater
- 1. "Avalanche" Released: April 13, 2009; 2. "Symphony" Released: June 2, 2009; 3. "Feel" Released: 2009

Professional ratings
Review scores
Source	Rating
Allmusic	2/5 stars

Breathing Underwater is the third studio album and second international studio album by American singer Marié Digby. It was released in Japan on June 24, 2009 and was released on September 7, 2009 on Amazon and on September 15, 2009 in the US and worldwide.

== Album leak ==
On April 8, 2009, "Breathing Underwater" was leaked onto the internet, months prior to the new September release date.

On April 9, 2009, Digby responded on her MySpace page to those concerned about the leak:

"Yesterday, my album advance was sent only to the folks at my record label, radio DJ's and music supervisors. It is just inevitable that one of those people are going to try and make a buck or put up the music just for their own personal satisfaction. [...] If you can't afford 8 dollars for an album, then you can always support your favorite artists by even just purchasing a song or two! If an artist I love had made a new album and it was on the internet, I would probably want it too !! But I would undoubtedly go and buy the album with pride on the date of release as well.. but that's just me :)"

== Track listing ==
No.	Title	Writer(s)	Length
1.	"Daybreak"	Digby; Warren "Oak" Felder; Ezekiel Lewis; Candice Nelson	3:59
2.	"Avalanche"	Digby; Brian Kennedy Seals; Frankie Storm	3:27
3.	"Breathing Underwater"	Seals; Troy Verges; Hillary Lindsey	4:03
4.	"Shoulda Been Simple"	Digby, Seals, Andre Merritt	4:06
5.	"Know You By Heart"	Digby, Felder, Storm, Andrew "Pop" Wansel	3:26
6.	"Feel"	Digby, Lewis, Reed Vertelney	3:25
7.	"Come Find Me"	Digby, Seals, Lindsey, Verges, Antwoine Collins	3:53
8.	"Symphony"	Digby, Collins, Claude Kelly	4:20
9.	"Machine"	Digby, Seals, Lewis	2:58
10.	"Overboard" (featuring Livvi Franc)	Digby; Franc; Kennedy; Storm	3:37
11.	"Love With a Stranger"	Digby; James Bunton; Corron Cole	4:11
12.	"Come to Life"	Digby, Seals, Storm	3:42
13.	"Crazier Things"	Storm; Kelly; Joel Kipnis; Kier Gist; Dan Wilenski; Brian Coleman	3:29

Bonus tracks for Japan
No.	Title	Writer(s)	Length
14.	"Sanctuary" (Also Available in Amazon.com)	Digby, Lewis, Vertelney	3:11
15.	"Make It Happen"	Digby, Storm, Madd Scientist [Theodore Thomas]	3:58
16.	"Surrender"	Digby, Thomas, Storm, Felder	3:44
17.	"Fool on Parade" (Also Available in iTunes US)	Digby, Bunton, Cole	3:22

== Singles ==
=== Digital singles ===
The album's lead U.S. single "Avalanche" was released on April 13, 2009. On September 21, 2009. A music video for Avalanche was posted on Marié's official YouTube. Another video was made for Asian countries, which is identical to the YouTube version but cuts out the behind-the-scenes clips and focuses more on the performance.

"Symphony", the album's second follow-up U.S. single was released on June 2, 2009. The song was used at the season 6 finale of The Hills.

=== Promotional singles ===
A Japanese promotional single, "Feel" was aired in Japan and a music video of it was posted to Marié's official YouTube on June 11, 2009. It was soon used as a promotion for her movie for the album.

== Breathing Underwater, the movie ==
On July 1, 2010, Digby released her first movie. It was a 17-episode musical series entitled Breathing Underwater. The series became viewable through ABCLounge.com. The movie was about Digby's personal life and how she got to make her third album. The movie starred herself, some of her friends and actors. The movie was brought by Hollywood Records and StoryMusicStory.

== Release history ==
Region	Date	Label
Japan	June 24, 2009	Avex Trax
Australia	July 15, 2009	Hollywood
United States	September 15, 2009	Hollywood
Brazil	January 19, 2010	Hollywood

== Chart performance ==
Chart	Peak position
United States Billboard 200	183
