= Wi-Fi 7 =

IEEE standard for wireless networks

- Icon used by the Wi-Fi Alliance for Wi-Fi 7
- Website: https://www.wi-fi.org/wi-fi-macphy

Wi-Fi and IEEE 802.11 generations
Genera- tion	IEEE standard	Adopt- ed	Link rate (Mbit/s)	Frequency (GHz)		
Genera- tion	IEEE standard	Adopt- ed	Link rate (Mbit/s)	2.4	5	6
—	802.11	1997	1–2	Yes		
—	802.11b	1999	1–11	Yes		
—	802.11a	1999	6–54		Yes	
—	802.11g	2003	6–54	Yes		
Wi-Fi 4	802.11n	2009	6.5–600	Yes	Yes	
Wi-Fi 5	802.11ac	2013	6.5–6,933	(Note: 802.11ac only specifies operation in the 5 GHz band. Operation in the 2.4 GHz band is specified by 802.11n.)	Yes	
Wi-Fi 6	802.11ax	2021	0.4–9,608	Yes	Yes	
Wi-Fi 6E	802.11ax	2021	0.4–9,608	Yes	Yes	Yes
Wi-Fi 7	802.11be	2024	0.4–23,059	Yes	Yes	Yes
Wi-Fi 8	802.11bn	TBA	0.4–23,059	Yes	Yes	Yes

IEEE 802.11be-2024 or 802.11be, dubbed Extremely High Throughput (EHT), is a wireless networking standard in the IEEE 802.11 set of protocols which is designated Wi-Fi 7 by the Wi-Fi Alliance. It is built upon Wi-Fi 6 (IEEE 802.11ax), focusing on WLAN indoor and outdoor operation with stationary and pedestrian speeds in the 2.4, 5, and 6 GHz frequency bands.

In a single band, throughput reaches a theoretical maximum of 23 Gbit/s, although actual results are much lower.

Development of the 802.11be amendment began with an initial draft in March 2021 and was approved by IEEE-SA under the designation IEEE 802.11be-2024, though the final published document was not released until 22 July 2025. Despite this, numerous products were announced in 2022 based on draft standards, with retail availability in early 2023. On 8 January 2024, the Wi-Fi Alliance introduced its Wi-Fi Certified 7 program to certify Wi-Fi 7 devices, as the technical requirements were essentially complete.

== Core features ==
The following are core features that have been approved as of Draft 3.0:

- 4096-QAM (4K-QAM) enables each symbol to carry 12 bits rather than 10 bits, resulting in 20% higher theoretical transmission rates than Wi-Fi 6's 1024-QAM, at the same symbol or baud rate. This feature is optional for Wi-Fi 7 certification.
- Contiguous and non-contiguous 320/160+160 MHz and 240/160+80 MHz bandwidth. This feature is optional for Wi-Fi 7 certification. (Note: see 3.2. – 320 MHz Channel Width)
- Multi-link Operation (MLO), a feature that increases capacity by simultaneously sending and receiving data across different frequency bands and channels. (2.4 GHz, 5 GHz, 6 GHz). This feature is mandatory for Wi-Fi 7 certification. Wi-Fi 7 builds on the technology of Wi-Fi 6 through the introduction of Multi-Link Operation (MLO), allowing users to connect to 2.4 GHz, 5 GHz, and 6 GHz bands simultaneously.
- 8 spatial streams and Multiple Input Multiple Output (MIMO) protocol enhancements (initial 16 but removed from the specs in 2024).
- Flexible Channel Utilization – Interference currently can negate an entire Wi-Fi channel. With preamble puncturing, a portion of the channel that is affected by interference can be blocked off while continuing to use the rest of the channel. This feature is mandatory for Wi-Fi 7 certification. (Note: see 3.4. – Preamble Puncturing)
- Multiple Resource Unit (MRU) – Improves OFDMA technology from Wi-Fi 6, allowing a single user to have multiple Resource Units. This feature is mandatory for Wi-Fi 7 certification.

== Candidate features ==
The main candidate features mentioned in the 802.11be Project Authorization Request (PAR) are:

- Multi-Access Point (AP) Coordination (e.g. coordinated and joint transmission).
- Enhanced link adaptation and retransmission protocol (e.g. Hybrid Automatic Repeat Request (HARQ)).
- If needed, adaptation to regulatory rules specific to 6 GHz spectrum.
- Integrating Time-Sensitive Networking (TSN) IEEE 802.1Q extensions for low-latency real-time traffic:
  - IEEE 802.1AS timing and synchronization
  - IEEE 802.11aa MAC Enhancements for Robust Audio Video Streaming (Stream Reservation Protocol over IEEE 802.11)
  - IEEE 802.11ak Enhancements for Transit Links Within Bridged Networks (802.11 links in 802.1Q networks)
  - Bounded latency: credit-based (IEEE 802.1Qav) and cyclic/time-aware traffic shaping (IEEE 802.1Qch/Qbv), asynchronous traffic scheduling (IEEE 802.1Qcr-2020)
  - IEEE 802.11ax Scheduled Operation extensions for reduced jitter/latency.

== Additional features ==
Apart from the features mentioned in the PAR, there are newly introduced features:

- Frame formats with improved forward-compatibility.
- Enhanced resource allocation in OFDMA.
- Implicit channel sounding, optimized to require less airtime.
- Support for direct links, managed by an access point.

== Rate set ==
Modulation and coding schemes
MCS index (Note: MCS 9 is not applicable to all combinations of channel width and spatial stream count.)	Modulation type	Coding rate	Data rate (Mbit/s) (Note: Per spatial stream)														
MCS index	Modulation type	Coding rate	20 MHz channels			40 MHz channels			80 MHz channels			160 MHz channels			320 MHz channels		
MCS index	Modulation type	Coding rate	3200 ns GI (Note: GI stands for guard interval.)	1600 ns GI	800 ns GI	3200 ns GI	1600 ns GI	800 ns GI	3200 ns GI	1600 ns GI	800 ns GI	3200 ns GI	1600 ns GI	800 ns GI	3200 ns GI	1600 ns GI	800 ns GI
0	BPSK	1/2	7	8	9	15	16	17	31	34	36	61	68	72	123	136	144
1	QPSK	1/2	15	16	17	29	33	34	61	68	72	122	136	144	245	272	288
2	QPSK	3/4	22	24	26	44	49	52	92	102	108	184	204	216	368	408	432
3	16-QAM	1/2	29	33	34	59	65	69	123	136	144	245	272	288	490	544	577
4	16-QAM	3/4	44	49	52	88	98	103	184	204	216	368	408	432	735	817	865
5	64-QAM	2/3	59	65	69	117	130	138	245	272	288	490	544	576	980	1089	1153
6	64-QAM	3/4	66	73	77	132	146	155	276	306	324	551	613	649	1103	1225	1297
7	64-QAM	5/6	73	81	86	146	163	172	306	340	360	613	681	721	1225	1361	1441
8	256-QAM	3/4	88	98	103	176	195	207	368	408	432	735	817	865	1470	1633	1729
9	256-QAM	5/6	98	108	115	195	217	229	408	453	480	817	907	961	1633	1815	1922
10	1024-QAM	3/4	110	122	129	219	244	258	459	510	540	919	1021	1081	1838	2042	2162
11	1024-QAM	5/6	122	135	143	244	271	287	510	567	600	1021	1134	1201	2042	2269	2402
12	4096-QAM	3/4	131	146	155	263	293	310	551	613	649	1103	1225	1297	2205	2450	2594
13	4096-QAM	5/6	146	163	172	293	325	344	613	681	721	1225	1361	1441	2450	2722	2882
14	BPSK-DCM-DUP	1/2							7	8	9	15	17	18	31	34	36
15	BPSK-DCM	1/2	4	4	4	7	8	9	15	17	18	31	34	36	61	68	72

== Comparison ==
802.11 network standards
Frequency range, or type	PHY	Protocol	Release date	Frequency band	Channel width	Stream data rate	Max. MIMO streams	Modulation	Approx. range	
Frequency range, or type	PHY	Protocol	Release date	Frequency band	Channel width	Stream data rate	Max. MIMO streams	Modulation	Indoor	Outdoor
Frequency range, or type	PHY	Protocol	Release date	(GHz)	(MHz)	(Mbit/s)	Max. MIMO streams	Modulation	Indoor	Outdoor
1–7 GHz	DSSS, ~~FHSS~~ (Note: This is obsolete, and support for this might be subject to removal in a future revision of the standard)	802.11-1997	June 1997	2.4	22	1, 2	—N/a	DSSS, ~~FHSS~~	20 m (66 ft)	100 m (330 ft)
1–7 GHz	HR/DSSS	802.11b	September 1999	2.4	22	1, 2, 5.5, 11	—N/a	CCK, DSSS	35 m (115 ft)	140 m (460 ft)
1–7 GHz	OFDM	802.11a	September 1999	5	5, 10, 20	6, 9, 12, 18, 24, 36, 48, 54 (for 20 MHz bandwidth, divide by 2 and 4 for 10 and 5 MHz)	—N/a	OFDM	35 m (115 ft)	120 m (390 ft)
1–7 GHz	OFDM	802.11j	November 2004	4.9, 5.0 (Note: For Japanese regulation.)	5, 10, 20	6, 9, 12, 18, 24, 36, 48, 54 (for 20 MHz bandwidth, divide by 2 and 4 for 10 and 5 MHz)	—N/a	OFDM	?	?
1–7 GHz	OFDM	802.11y	November 2008	3.7 (Note: IEEE 802.11y-2008 extended operation of 802.11a to the licensed 3.7 GHz band. Increased power limits allow a range up to 5,000 m. As of 2009, it is only being licensed in the United States by the FCC.)	5, 10, 20	6, 9, 12, 18, 24, 36, 48, 54 (for 20 MHz bandwidth, divide by 2 and 4 for 10 and 5 MHz)	—N/a	OFDM	?	5,000 m (16,000 ft)
1–7 GHz	OFDM	802.11p	July 2010	5.9	5, 10, 20	6, 9, 12, 18, 24, 36, 48, 54 (for 20 MHz bandwidth, divide by 2 and 4 for 10 and 5 MHz)	—N/a	OFDM	200 m	1,000 m (3,300 ft)
1–7 GHz	OFDM	802.11bd	December 2022	5.9, 60	5, 10, 20	6, 9, 12, 18, 24, 36, 48, 54 (for 20 MHz bandwidth, divide by 2 and 4 for 10 and 5 MHz)	—N/a	OFDM	500 m	1,000 m (3,300 ft)
1–7 GHz	ERP-OFDM	802.11g	June 2003	2.4	5, 10, 20	6, 9, 12, 18, 24, 36, 48, 54 (for 20 MHz bandwidth, divide by 2 and 4 for 10 and 5 MHz)	—N/a	OFDM	38 m (125 ft)	140 m (460 ft)
1–7 GHz	HT-OFDM	802.11n (Wi-Fi 4)	October 2009	2.4, 5	20	Up to 288.8 (Note: Based on short guard interval; standard guard interval is ~10% slower. Rates vary widely based on distance, obstructions, and interference.)	4	MIMO-OFDM (64-QAM)	70 m (230 ft)	250 m (820 ft)
1–7 GHz	HT-OFDM	802.11n (Wi-Fi 4)	October 2009	2.4, 5	40	Up to 600	4	MIMO-OFDM (64-QAM)	70 m (230 ft)	250 m (820 ft)
1–7 GHz	VHT-OFDM	802.11ac (Wi-Fi 5)	December 2013	5	20	Up to 693	8	DL; MU-MIMO OFDM (256-QAM)	35 m (115 ft)	?
1–7 GHz	VHT-OFDM	802.11ac (Wi-Fi 5)	December 2013	5	40	Up to 1,600	8	DL; MU-MIMO OFDM (256-QAM)	35 m (115 ft)	?
1–7 GHz	VHT-OFDM	802.11ac (Wi-Fi 5)	December 2013	5	80	Up to 3,467	8	DL; MU-MIMO OFDM (256-QAM)	35 m (115 ft)	?
1–7 GHz	VHT-OFDM	802.11ac (Wi-Fi 5)	December 2013	5	160	Up to 6,933	8	DL; MU-MIMO OFDM (256-QAM)	35 m (115 ft)	?
1–7 GHz	HE-OFDMA	802.11ax (Wi-Fi 6, Wi-Fi 6E)	May 2021	2.4, 5, 6	20	Up to 1,147 (Note: For single-user cases only, based on default guard interval which is 0.8 microseconds. Since multi-user via OFDMA has become available for 802.11ax, these may decrease. Also, these theoretical values depend on the link distance, whether the link is line-of-sight or not, interferences and the multi-path components in the environment.)	8	UL/DL; MU-MIMO OFDMA (1024-QAM)	30 m (98 ft)	120 m (390 ft) (Note: The default guard interval is 0.8 microseconds. However, 802.11ax extended the maximum available guard interval to 3.2 microseconds, in order to support outdoor communications, where the maximum possible propagation delay is larger compared to Indoor environments.)
1–7 GHz	HE-OFDMA	802.11ax (Wi-Fi 6, Wi-Fi 6E)	May 2021	2.4, 5, 6	40	Up to 2,294	8	UL/DL; MU-MIMO OFDMA (1024-QAM)	30 m (98 ft)	120 m (390 ft)
1–7 GHz	HE-OFDMA	802.11ax (Wi-Fi 6, Wi-Fi 6E)	May 2021	2.4, 5, 6	80	Up to 5,500	8	UL/DL; MU-MIMO OFDMA (1024-QAM)	30 m (98 ft)	120 m (390 ft)
1–7 GHz	HE-OFDMA	802.11ax (Wi-Fi 6, Wi-Fi 6E)	May 2021	2.4, 5, 6	80+80	Up to 11,000	8	UL/DL; MU-MIMO OFDMA (1024-QAM)	30 m (98 ft)	120 m (390 ft)
1–7 GHz	EHT-OFDMA	802.11be (Wi-Fi 7)	Sep 2024	2.4, 5, 6	80	Up to 5,764	8	UL/DL; MU-MIMO OFDMA (4096-QAM)	30 m (98 ft)	120 m (390 ft)
1–7 GHz	EHT-OFDMA	802.11be (Wi-Fi 7)	Sep 2024	2.4, 5, 6	160 (80+80)	Up to 11,500	8	UL/DL; MU-MIMO OFDMA (4096-QAM)	30 m (98 ft)	120 m (390 ft)
1–7 GHz	EHT-OFDMA	802.11be (Wi-Fi 7)	Sep 2024	2.4, 5, 6	240 (160+80)	Up to 14,282	8	UL/DL; MU-MIMO OFDMA (4096-QAM)	30 m (98 ft)	120 m (390 ft)
1–7 GHz	EHT-OFDMA	802.11be (Wi-Fi 7)	Sep 2024	2.4, 5, 6	320 (160+160)	Up to 23,059	8	UL/DL; MU-MIMO OFDMA (4096-QAM)	30 m (98 ft)	120 m (390 ft)
1–7 GHz	UHR	802.11bn (Wi-Fi 8)	May 2028 (est.)	2.4, 5, 6	320	Up to 23,059	8	Multi-link; MU-MIMO OFDM (4096-QAM)	?	?
1–7 GHz	WUR (Note: Wake-up Radio (WUR) Operation.)	802.11ba	October 2021	2.4, 5	4, 20	0.0625, 0.25 (62.5 kbit/s, 250 kbit/s)	—N/a	OOK (multi-carrier OOK)	?	?
mmWave (WiGig)	DMG	802.11ad	December 2012	60	2,160 (2.16 GHz)	Up to 8,085 (8 Gbit/s)	—N/a	~~OFDM~~, single carrier, low-power single carrier	3.3 m (11 ft)	?
mmWave (WiGig)	DMG	802.11aj	April 2018	60 (Note: For Chinese regulation.)	1,080	Up to 3,754 (3.75 Gbit/s)	—N/a	single carrier, low-power single carrier	?	?
mmWave (WiGig)	CMMG	802.11aj	April 2018	45	540, 1,080	Up to 15,015 (15 Gbit/s)	4	OFDM, single carrier	?	?
mmWave (WiGig)	EDMG	802.11ay	July 2021	60	Up to 8,640 (8.64 GHz)	Up to 303,336 (303 Gbit/s)	8	OFDM, single carrier	10 m (33 ft)	100 m (328 ft)
Sub 1 GHz (IoT)	TVHT	802.11af	February 2014	0.054– 0.79	6, 7, 8	Up to 568.9	4	MIMO-OFDM	?	?
Sub 1 GHz (IoT)	S1G	802.11ah	May 2017	0.7, 0.8, 0.9	1–16	Up to 8.67 (@2 MHz)	4	MIMO-OFDM	?	?
Light (Li-Fi)	LC (VLC/OWC)	802.11bb	November 2023	800–1000 nm	20	Up to 9.6 Gbit/s	—N/a	O-OFDM	?	?
Light (Li-Fi)	~~IR~~ (IrDA)	802.11-1997	June 1997	850–900 nm	?	1, 2	—N/a	~~PPM~~	?	?
802.11 Standard rollups
		802.11-2007 (802.11ma)	March 2007	2.4, 5		Up to 54		DSSS, OFDM		
		802.11-2012 (802.11mb)	March 2012	2.4, 5		Up to 150		DSSS, OFDM		
		802.11-2016 (802.11mc)	December 2016	2.4, 5, 60		Up to 866.7 or 6,757		DSSS, OFDM		
		802.11-2020 (802.11md)	December 2020	2.4, 5, 60		Up to 866.7 or 6,757		DSSS, OFDM		
		802.11-2024 (802.11me)	September 2024	2.4, 5, 6, 60		Up to 9,608 or 303,336		DSSS, OFDM		

== 802.11be Task Group ==
The 802.11be Task Group is led by individuals affiliated with Qualcomm, Intel, and Broadcom. Those affiliated with Huawei, Maxlinear, NXP, and Apple also have senior positions.

== Commercial availability ==
=== Hardware ===
The Wi-Fi Alliance maintains a list of Wi-Fi 7 certified devices.

=== Software ===
Android 13 and higher provide support for Wi-Fi 7.

The Linux 6.2 kernel provides support for Wi-Fi 7 devices. The 6.4 kernel added Wi-Fi 7 mesh support. Linux 6.5 included significant driver support by Intel engineers, particularly support for MLO.

Support for Wi-Fi 7 was added to Windows 11, as of build 26063.1.
