= IEEE 802.11a-1999 =

Wireless networking standard

Wi-Fi and IEEE 802.11 generations
Genera- tion	IEEE standard	Adopt- ed	Link rate (Mbit/s)	Frequency (GHz)		
Genera- tion	IEEE standard	Adopt- ed	Link rate (Mbit/s)	2.4	5	6
—	802.11	1997	1–2	Yes		
—	802.11b	1999	1–11	Yes		
—	802.11a	1999	6–54		Yes	
—	802.11g	2003	6–54	Yes		
Wi-Fi 4	802.11n	2009	6.5–600	Yes	Yes	
Wi-Fi 5	802.11ac	2013	6.5–6,933	(Note: 802.11ac only specifies operation in the 5 GHz band. Operation in the 2.4 GHz band is specified by 802.11n.)	Yes	
Wi-Fi 6	802.11ax	2021	0.4–9,608	Yes	Yes	
Wi-Fi 6E	802.11ax	2021	0.4–9,608	Yes	Yes	Yes
Wi-Fi 7	802.11be	2024	0.4–23,059	Yes	Yes	Yes
Wi-Fi 8	802.11bn	TBA	0.4–23,059	Yes	Yes	Yes

IEEE 802.11a-1999 or 802.11a was an amendment to the IEEE 802.11 wireless local network specifications that defined requirements for an orthogonal frequency-division multiplexing (OFDM) communication system. It was originally designed to support wireless communication in the unlicensed national information infrastructure (U-NII) bands (in the 5–6 GHz frequency range) as regulated in the United States by the Code of Federal Regulations, Title 47, Section 15.407.

Originally described as clause 17 of the 1999 specification, it is now defined in clause 18 of the 2012 specification and provides protocols that allow transmission, and reception of data at rates of 1.5 to 54 Mbit/s. It has seen widespread worldwide implementation, particularly within the corporate workspace. While the original amendment is no longer valid, the term "802.11a" is still used by wireless access point (cards and routers) manufacturers to describe interoperability of their systems at 5.8 GHz, 54 Mbit/s.

802.11 is a set of IEEE standards that govern wireless networking transmission methods. They are commonly used today in their 802.11a, 802.11b, 802.11g, 802.11n, 802.11ac and 802.11ax versions to provide wireless connectivity in the home, office and some commercial establishments.

== Description ==
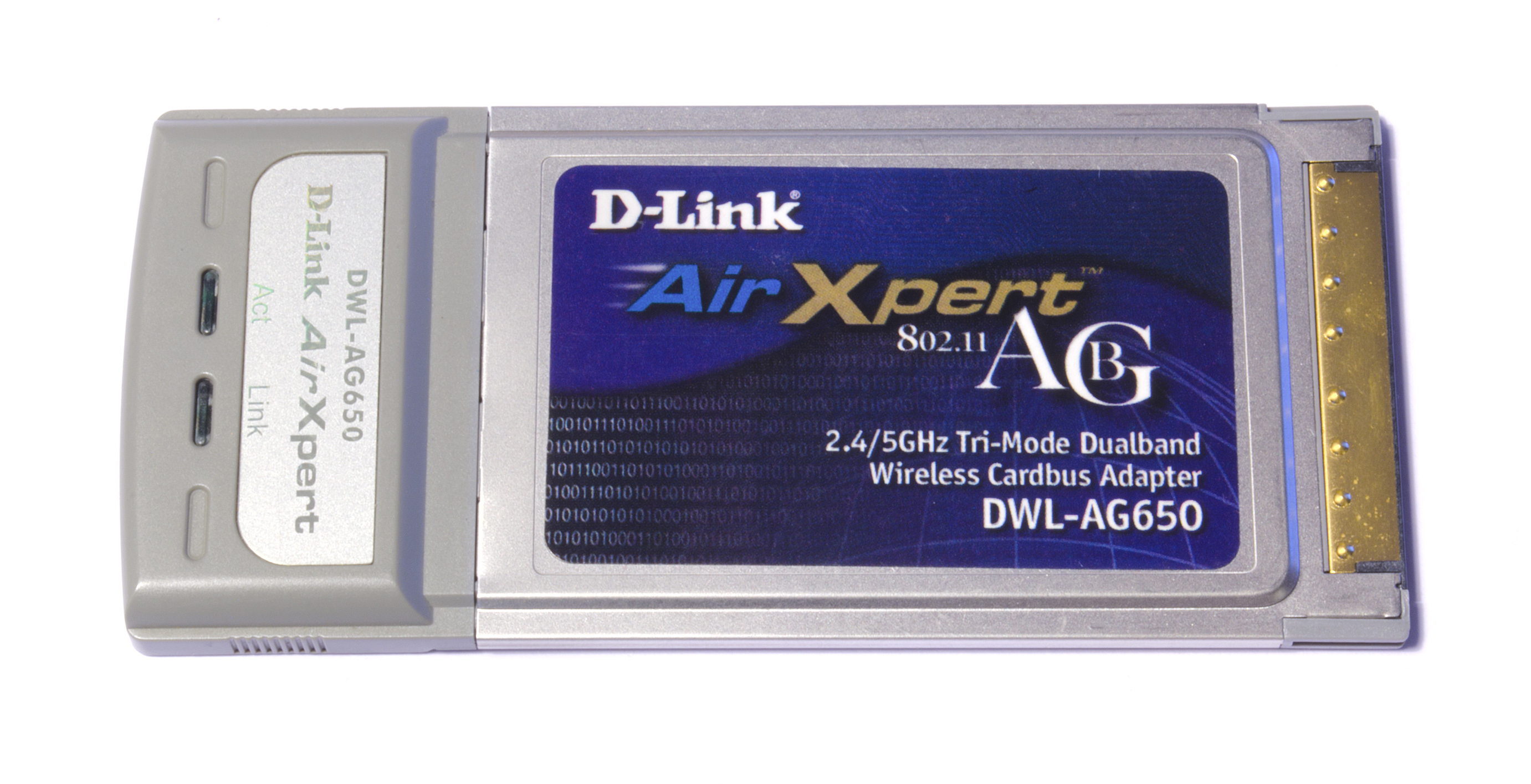
D-Link wireless Cardbus adaptor from the mid-2000s. Unlike many others from its era, this model supported 802.11a (5 GHz) in addition to the more common 802.11b and 802.11g.

IEEE802.11a is the first wireless standard to employ packet based OFDM, based on a proposal from Richard van Nee from Lucent Technologies in Nieuwegein. OFDM was adopted as a draft 802.11a standard in July 1998 after merging with an NTT proposal. It was ratified in 1999. The 802.11a standard uses the same core protocol as the original standard, operates in 5 GHz band, and uses a 52-subcarrier orthogonal frequency-division multiplexing (OFDM) with a maximum raw data rate of 54 Mbit/s, which yields realistic net achievable throughput in the mid-20 Mbit/s. The data rate is reduced to 48, 36, 24, 18, 12, 9 then 6 Mbit/s if required. 802.11a originally had 12/13 non-overlapping channels, 12 that can be used indoor, and 4/5 of the 12 that can be used in outdoor point to point configurations. Recently many countries of the world are allowing operation in the 5.47 to 5.725 GHz Band as a secondary user using a sharing method derived in 802.11h. This will add another 12/13 Channels to the overall 5 GHz band enabling significant overall wireless network capacity enabling the possibility of 24+ channels in some countries. 802.11a is not interoperable with 802.11b as they operate on separate bands. Most enterprise class Access Points have dual band capability.

Using the 5 GHz band gives 802.11a a significant advantage, since the 2.4 GHz band is heavily used to the point of being crowded. Degradation caused by such conflicts can cause frequent dropped connections and degradation of service. However, this high carrier frequency also brings a slight disadvantage: The effective overall range of 802.11a is slightly less than that of 802.11b/g; 802.11a signals cannot penetrate as far as those for 802.11b because they are absorbed more readily by walls and other solid objects in their path, because the path loss in signal strength is proportional to the square of the signal frequency. On the other hand, OFDM has fundamental propagation advantages when in a high multipath environment, such as an indoor office, and the higher frequencies enable the building of smaller antennas with higher RF system gain which counteract the disadvantage of a higher band of operation. The increased number of usable channels (4 to 8 times as many in FCC countries) and the near absence of other interfering systems (microwave ovens, cordless phones, baby monitors) give 802.11a significant aggregate bandwidth and reliability advantages over 802.11b/g.

== Regulatory issues ==
Different countries have different regulatory support, although a 2003 World Radiotelecommunications Conference improved worldwide standards coordination. 802.11a was quickly approved by regulations in the United States and Japan, but in other areas, such as the European Union, it had to wait longer for approval. European regulators were considering the use of the European HIPERLAN standard, but in mid-2002 cleared 802.11a for use in Europe.

== Timing and compatibility of products ==
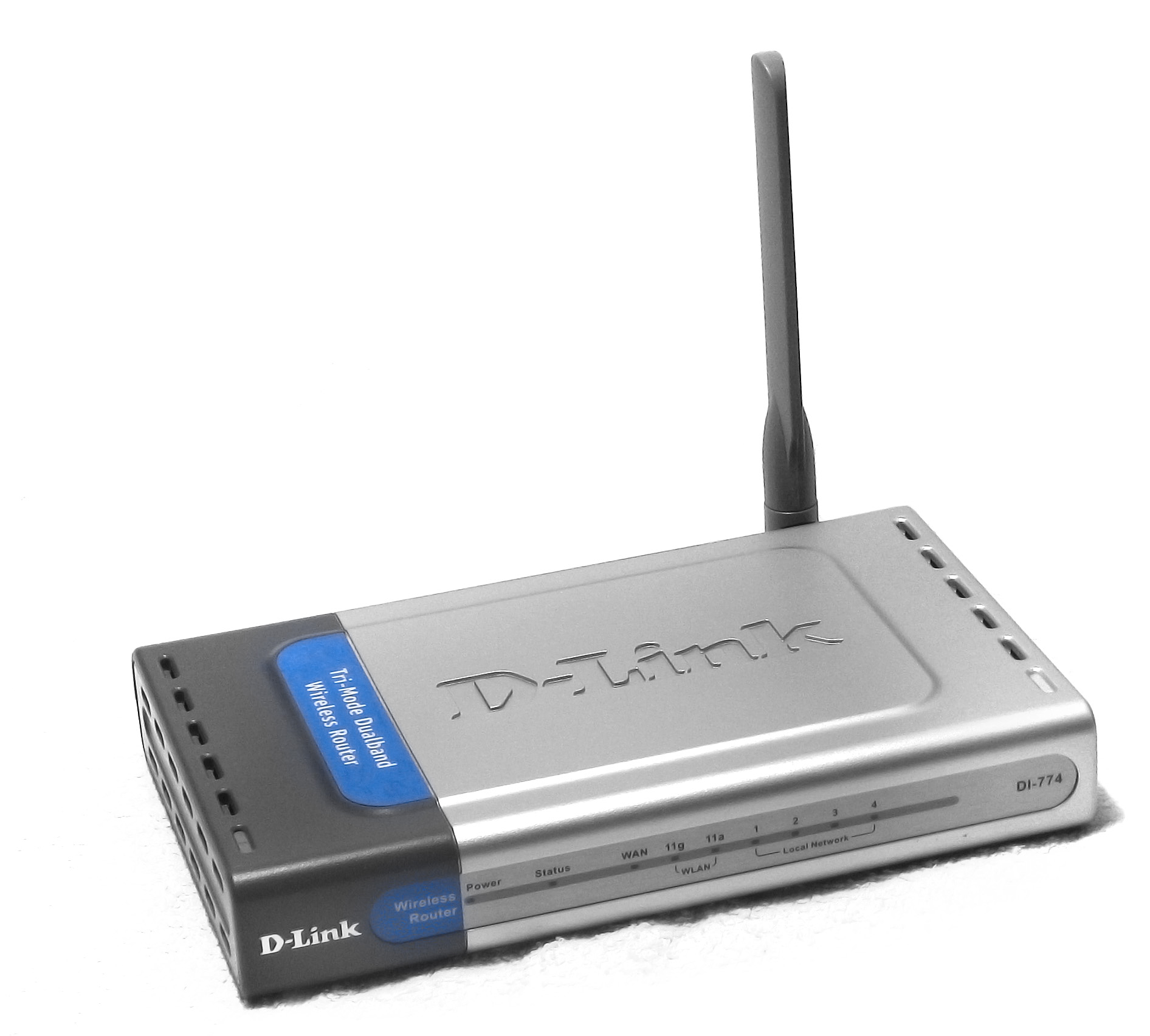
D-Link DI-774 router from the 2000s. This model supports 802.11a in addition to the more widely-supported 802.11b and 802.11g standards.

802.11a products started shipping late, lagging 802.11b products due to 5 GHz components being more difficult to manufacture. First generation product performance was poor and plagued with problems. When second generation products started shipping, 802.11a was not widely adopted in the consumer space primarily because the less-expensive 802.11b was already widely adopted. However, 802.11a later saw significant penetration into enterprise network environments, despite the initial cost disadvantages, particularly for businesses which required increased capacity and reliability over 802.11b/g-only networks.

With the arrival of less expensive early 802.11g products on the market, which were backwards-compatible with 802.11b, but used OFDM(like 802.11a) to increase the capacity, the bandwidth advantage of the 5 GHz 802.11a was eliminated. Manufacturers of 802.11a equipment responded to the lack of market success by significantly improving the implementations (current-generation 802.11a technology has range characteristics nearly identical to those of 802.11b), and by making technology that can use more than one band a standard.

Dual-band, or dual-mode Access Points and Network Interface Cards (NICs) that can automatically handle a and b/g, are now common in all the markets, and very close in price to b/g- only devices.

== Technical description ==
Of the 52 OFDM subcarriers, 48 are for data and 4 are pilot subcarriers with a carrier separation of 0.3125 MHz (20 MHz/64). Each of these subcarriers can be a BPSK, QPSK, 16-QAM or 64-QAM. The total bandwidth is 20 MHz with an occupied bandwidth of 16.6 MHz. Symbol duration is 4 microseconds, which includes a guard interval of 0.8 microseconds. The actual generation and decoding of orthogonal components is done in baseband using DSP which is then upconverted to 5 GHz at the transmitter. Each of the subcarriers could be represented as a complex number. The time domain signal is generated by taking an Inverse Fast Fourier transform (IFFT). Correspondingly the receiver downconverts, samples at 20 MHz and does an FFT to retrieve the original coefficients. The advantages of using OFDM include reduced multipath effects in reception and increased spectral efficiency.

RATE bits	Modulation type	Coding rate	Data rate (Mbit/s) (Note: The data rate is for 20 MHz channel spacing.)
1101	BPSK	1/2	6
1111	BPSK	3/4	9
0101	QPSK	1/2	12
0111	QPSK	3/4	18
1001	16-QAM	1/2	24
1011	16-QAM	3/4	36
0001	64-QAM	2/3	48
0011	64-QAM	3/4	54

== Comparison ==
802.11 network standards
Frequency range, or type	PHY	Protocol	Release date	Frequency band	Channel width	Stream data rate	Max. MIMO streams	Modulation	Approx. range	
Frequency range, or type	PHY	Protocol	Release date	Frequency band	Channel width	Stream data rate	Max. MIMO streams	Modulation	Indoor	Outdoor
Frequency range, or type	PHY	Protocol	Release date	(GHz)	(MHz)	(Mbit/s)	Max. MIMO streams	Modulation	Indoor	Outdoor
1–7 GHz	DSSS, ~~FHSS~~ (Note: This is obsolete, and support for this might be subject to removal in a future revision of the standard)	802.11-1997	June 1997	2.4	22	1, 2	—N/a	DSSS, ~~FHSS~~	20 m (66 ft)	100 m (330 ft)
1–7 GHz	HR/DSSS	802.11b	September 1999	2.4	22	1, 2, 5.5, 11	—N/a	CCK, DSSS	35 m (115 ft)	140 m (460 ft)
1–7 GHz	OFDM	802.11a	September 1999	5	5, 10, 20	6, 9, 12, 18, 24, 36, 48, 54 (for 20 MHz bandwidth, divide by 2 and 4 for 10 and 5 MHz)	—N/a	OFDM	35 m (115 ft)	120 m (390 ft)
1–7 GHz	OFDM	802.11j	November 2004	4.9, 5.0 (Note: For Japanese regulation.)	5, 10, 20	6, 9, 12, 18, 24, 36, 48, 54 (for 20 MHz bandwidth, divide by 2 and 4 for 10 and 5 MHz)	—N/a	OFDM	?	?
1–7 GHz	OFDM	802.11y	November 2008	3.7 (Note: IEEE 802.11y-2008 extended operation of 802.11a to the licensed 3.7 GHz band. Increased power limits allow a range up to 5,000 m. As of 2009, it is only being licensed in the United States by the FCC.)	5, 10, 20	6, 9, 12, 18, 24, 36, 48, 54 (for 20 MHz bandwidth, divide by 2 and 4 for 10 and 5 MHz)	—N/a	OFDM	?	5,000 m (16,000 ft)
1–7 GHz	OFDM	802.11p	July 2010	5.9	5, 10, 20	6, 9, 12, 18, 24, 36, 48, 54 (for 20 MHz bandwidth, divide by 2 and 4 for 10 and 5 MHz)	—N/a	OFDM	200 m	1,000 m (3,300 ft)
1–7 GHz	OFDM	802.11bd	December 2022	5.9, 60	5, 10, 20	6, 9, 12, 18, 24, 36, 48, 54 (for 20 MHz bandwidth, divide by 2 and 4 for 10 and 5 MHz)	—N/a	OFDM	500 m	1,000 m (3,300 ft)
1–7 GHz	ERP-OFDM	802.11g	June 2003	2.4	5, 10, 20	6, 9, 12, 18, 24, 36, 48, 54 (for 20 MHz bandwidth, divide by 2 and 4 for 10 and 5 MHz)	—N/a	OFDM	38 m (125 ft)	140 m (460 ft)
1–7 GHz	HT-OFDM	802.11n (Wi-Fi 4)	October 2009	2.4, 5	20	Up to 288.8 (Note: Based on short guard interval; standard guard interval is ~10% slower. Rates vary widely based on distance, obstructions, and interference.)	4	MIMO-OFDM (64-QAM)	70 m (230 ft)	250 m (820 ft)
1–7 GHz	HT-OFDM	802.11n (Wi-Fi 4)	October 2009	2.4, 5	40	Up to 600	4	MIMO-OFDM (64-QAM)	70 m (230 ft)	250 m (820 ft)
1–7 GHz	VHT-OFDM	802.11ac (Wi-Fi 5)	December 2013	5	20	Up to 693	8	DL; MU-MIMO OFDM (256-QAM)	35 m (115 ft)	?
1–7 GHz	VHT-OFDM	802.11ac (Wi-Fi 5)	December 2013	5	40	Up to 1,600	8	DL; MU-MIMO OFDM (256-QAM)	35 m (115 ft)	?
1–7 GHz	VHT-OFDM	802.11ac (Wi-Fi 5)	December 2013	5	80	Up to 3,467	8	DL; MU-MIMO OFDM (256-QAM)	35 m (115 ft)	?
1–7 GHz	VHT-OFDM	802.11ac (Wi-Fi 5)	December 2013	5	160	Up to 6,933	8	DL; MU-MIMO OFDM (256-QAM)	35 m (115 ft)	?
1–7 GHz	HE-OFDMA	802.11ax (Wi-Fi 6, Wi-Fi 6E)	May 2021	2.4, 5, 6	20	Up to 1,147 (Note: For single-user cases only, based on default guard interval which is 0.8 microseconds. Since multi-user via OFDMA has become available for 802.11ax, these may decrease. Also, these theoretical values depend on the link distance, whether the link is line-of-sight or not, interferences and the multi-path components in the environment.)	8	UL/DL; MU-MIMO OFDMA (1024-QAM)	30 m (98 ft)	120 m (390 ft) (Note: The default guard interval is 0.8 microseconds. However, 802.11ax extended the maximum available guard interval to 3.2 microseconds, in order to support outdoor communications, where the maximum possible propagation delay is larger compared to Indoor environments.)
1–7 GHz	HE-OFDMA	802.11ax (Wi-Fi 6, Wi-Fi 6E)	May 2021	2.4, 5, 6	40	Up to 2,294	8	UL/DL; MU-MIMO OFDMA (1024-QAM)	30 m (98 ft)	120 m (390 ft)
1–7 GHz	HE-OFDMA	802.11ax (Wi-Fi 6, Wi-Fi 6E)	May 2021	2.4, 5, 6	80	Up to 5,500	8	UL/DL; MU-MIMO OFDMA (1024-QAM)	30 m (98 ft)	120 m (390 ft)
1–7 GHz	HE-OFDMA	802.11ax (Wi-Fi 6, Wi-Fi 6E)	May 2021	2.4, 5, 6	80+80	Up to 11,000	8	UL/DL; MU-MIMO OFDMA (1024-QAM)	30 m (98 ft)	120 m (390 ft)
1–7 GHz	EHT-OFDMA	802.11be (Wi-Fi 7)	Sep 2024	2.4, 5, 6	80	Up to 5,764	8	UL/DL; MU-MIMO OFDMA (4096-QAM)	30 m (98 ft)	120 m (390 ft)
1–7 GHz	EHT-OFDMA	802.11be (Wi-Fi 7)	Sep 2024	2.4, 5, 6	160 (80+80)	Up to 11,500	8	UL/DL; MU-MIMO OFDMA (4096-QAM)	30 m (98 ft)	120 m (390 ft)
1–7 GHz	EHT-OFDMA	802.11be (Wi-Fi 7)	Sep 2024	2.4, 5, 6	240 (160+80)	Up to 14,282	8	UL/DL; MU-MIMO OFDMA (4096-QAM)	30 m (98 ft)	120 m (390 ft)
1–7 GHz	EHT-OFDMA	802.11be (Wi-Fi 7)	Sep 2024	2.4, 5, 6	320 (160+160)	Up to 23,059	8	UL/DL; MU-MIMO OFDMA (4096-QAM)	30 m (98 ft)	120 m (390 ft)
1–7 GHz	UHR	802.11bn (Wi-Fi 8)	May 2028 (est.)	2.4, 5, 6	320	Up to 23,059	8	Multi-link; MU-MIMO OFDM (4096-QAM)	?	?
1–7 GHz	WUR (Note: Wake-up Radio (WUR) Operation.)	802.11ba	October 2021	2.4, 5	4, 20	0.0625, 0.25 (62.5 kbit/s, 250 kbit/s)	—N/a	OOK (multi-carrier OOK)	?	?
mmWave (WiGig)	DMG	802.11ad	December 2012	60	2,160 (2.16 GHz)	Up to 8,085 (8 Gbit/s)	—N/a	~~OFDM~~, single carrier, low-power single carrier	3.3 m (11 ft)	?
mmWave (WiGig)	DMG	802.11aj	April 2018	60 (Note: For Chinese regulation.)	1,080	Up to 3,754 (3.75 Gbit/s)	—N/a	single carrier, low-power single carrier	?	?
mmWave (WiGig)	CMMG	802.11aj	April 2018	45	540, 1,080	Up to 15,015 (15 Gbit/s)	4	OFDM, single carrier	?	?
mmWave (WiGig)	EDMG	802.11ay	July 2021	60	Up to 8,640 (8.64 GHz)	Up to 303,336 (303 Gbit/s)	8	OFDM, single carrier	10 m (33 ft)	100 m (328 ft)
Sub 1 GHz (IoT)	TVHT	802.11af	February 2014	0.054– 0.79	6, 7, 8	Up to 568.9	4	MIMO-OFDM	?	?
Sub 1 GHz (IoT)	S1G	802.11ah	May 2017	0.7, 0.8, 0.9	1–16	Up to 8.67 (@2 MHz)	4	MIMO-OFDM	?	?
Light (Li-Fi)	LC (VLC/OWC)	802.11bb	November 2023	800–1000 nm	20	Up to 9.6 Gbit/s	—N/a	O-OFDM	?	?
Light (Li-Fi)	~~IR~~ (IrDA)	802.11-1997	June 1997	850–900 nm	?	1, 2	—N/a	~~PPM~~	?	?
802.11 Standard rollups
		802.11-2007 (802.11ma)	March 2007	2.4, 5		Up to 54		DSSS, OFDM		
		802.11-2012 (802.11mb)	March 2012	2.4, 5		Up to 150		DSSS, OFDM		
		802.11-2016 (802.11mc)	December 2016	2.4, 5, 60		Up to 866.7 or 6,757		DSSS, OFDM		
		802.11-2020 (802.11md)	December 2020	2.4, 5, 60		Up to 866.7 or 6,757		DSSS, OFDM		
		802.11-2024 (802.11me)	September 2024	2.4, 5, 6, 60		Up to 9,608 or 303,336		DSSS, OFDM		

== See also ==
- Clear channel assessment attack
- List of WLAN channels
- OFDM system comparison table
- Spectral efficiency comparison table
