= Huawei Mediapad M5 =

Line of tablets developed by Huawei

Huawei Mediapad M5 8 Huawei Mediapad M5 10 Huawei Mediapad M5 10 Pro
- Manufacturer: Huawei
- Type: Tablet
- Series: Huawei Mediapad
- First released: February 25, 2018; 8 years ago
- Availability by region: May 25, 2018; 8 years ago
- Predecessor: Huawei Mediapad M3
- Compatible networks: TD-LTE; FDD-LTE; TD-SCDMA; WCDMA; CDMA2000; CDMA 1X; GSM
- Form factor: Slate
- Dimensions: M5 10.8: 258.7 mm (10.19 in) H 171.8 mm (6.76 in) W 7.3 mm (0.29 in) D
- Weight: M5 8: 316 g (11.1 oz); M5 10: 498 g (17.6 oz); M5 10 Pro: 498 g (17.6 oz)
- Operating system: Android 8.0 "Oreo" Upgradable to Android 9 Pie With EMUI 9.1
- System-on-chip: Kirin 960
- CPU: 4xCortex A73 2.36GHz + 4xCortex A53 1.8GHz + i7 co-processor
- GPU: Mali G71 MP8
- Memory: 4 GB LPDDR4
- Storage: 64 GB UFS 2.1
- Removable storage: microSD, up to 256 GB
- Battery: 7500 mAh Li-Po battery
- Rear camera: 13 MP, f/2.2, OIS
- Front camera: 8 MP, f/2.2, OIS
- Display: 8.4 inch 2K IPS; 10.8 inch 2K IPS
- Sound: Histen 3D Audio
- Connectivity: Wi-Fi (802.11 a/b/g/n/ac), BT4.2, GPS/Glonass/BDS

Huawei Mediapad M5 is a series of tablets designed and marketed by Huawei, comprising three models: an 8.4 inch model, a 10.8 inch model, and a 10.8 inch Pro model. Each model came with a Wi-Fi version and a Wi-Fi+LTE version.

For the larger variant, Huawei also includes a desktop mode which allows the user to switch the mobile interface to a traditional desktop interface, by pairing with a keyboard accessory that allows it to work like a laptop.

The Huawei Mediapad M5 is a compact, high-performance Android tablet released to the market in 2018, filling the market gap after Sony's exit from the tablet market.

In 2020, the next M6 model was released based on the 7 nm Kirin 980.

The M5 has a USB-C port, however it supports USB 2.0, not USB 3.0, so it does not support HDMI over USB. It does support screen mirroring.
