= IEEE 802.11ac =

Wireless networking standard in the 802.11 family

Wi-Fi and IEEE 802.11 generations
Gen.	IEEE standard	Adopt.	Link rate (Mbit/s)	RF (GHz)		
Gen.	IEEE standard	Adopt.	Link rate (Mbit/s)	2.4	5	6
—	802.11	1997	1–2	Yes		
—	802.11b	1999	1–11	Yes		
—	802.11a	1999	6–54		Yes	
—	802.11g	2003	6–54	Yes		
Wi-Fi 4	802.11n	2009	6.5–600	Yes	Yes	
Wi-Fi 5	802.11ac	2013	6.5–6,933	(Note: 802.11ac only specifies operation in the 5 GHz band. Operation in the 2.4 GHz band is specified by 802.11n.)	Yes	
Wi-Fi 6	802.11ax	2021	0.4–9,608	Yes	Yes	
Wi-Fi 6E	802.11ax	2021	0.4–9,608	Yes	Yes	Yes
Wi-Fi 7	802.11be	2024	0.4–23,059	Yes	Yes	Yes
Wi-Fi 8	802.11bn	TBA	0.4–23,059	Yes	Yes	Yes

IEEE 802.11ac, formally IEEE 802.11ac-2013 and also simply called 802.11ac, is a wireless networking standard in the IEEE 802.11 set of protocols (which is part of the Wi-Fi networking family), providing high-throughput wireless local area networks (WLANs) on the 5 GHz band. (Note: 802.11ac only specifies operation in the 5 GHz band. Operation in the 2.4 GHz band is specified by 802.11n.) The standard has been retroactively labelled as Wi-Fi 5 by Wi-Fi Alliance.

The specification has multi-station throughput of at least 1.1 gigabit per second (1.1 Gbit/s) and single-link throughput of at least 500 megabits per second (0.5 Gbit/s). This is accomplished by extending the air-interface concepts embraced by 802.11n: wider RF bandwidth (up to 160 MHz), more MIMO spatial streams (up to eight), downlink multi-user MIMO (up to four clients), and high-density modulation (up to 256-QAM).

The Wi-Fi Alliance separated the introduction of 802.11ac wireless products into two phases ("waves"), named "Wave 1" and "Wave 2". From mid-2013, the alliance started certifying Wave 1 802.11ac products shipped by manufacturers, based on the IEEE 802.11ac Draft 3.0 (the IEEE standard was not finalized until later that year). Subsequently, in 2016, Wi-Fi Alliance introduced the Wave 2 certification, which includes additional features like MU-MIMO (downlink only), 160 MHz channel width support, support for more 5 GHz channels, and four spatial streams (with four antennas; compared to three in Wave 1 and 802.11n, and eight in IEEE's 802.11ax specification). It meant Wave 2 products would have higher bandwidth and capacity than Wave 1 products.

== New technologies ==
New technologies introduced with 802.11ac include the following:

- Extended channel binding
  - Optional 160 MHz and mandatory 80 MHz channel bandwidth for stations; cf. 40 MHz maximum in 802.11n.
- More MIMO spatial streams
  - Support for up to eight spatial streams (vs. four in 802.11n)
- Downlink multi-user MIMO (MU-MIMO, allows up to four simultaneous downlink MU-MIMO clients)
  - Multiple STAs, each with one or more antennas, transmit or receive independent data streams simultaneously.
    - Space-division multiple access (SDMA): streams not separated by frequency, but instead resolved spatially, analogous to 11n-style MIMO.
  - Downlink MU-MIMO (one transmitting device, multiple receiving devices) included as an optional mode.
- Modulation
  - 256-QAM, rate 3/4 and 5/6, added as optional modes (vs. 64-QAM, rate 5/6 maximum in 802.11n).
  - Some vendors offer a non-standard 1024-QAM mode, providing 25% higher data rate compared to 256-QAM
- Other elements/features
  - Beamforming with standardized sounding and feedback for compatibility between vendors (non-standard in 802.11n made it hard for beamforming to work effectively between different vendor products)
  - MAC modifications (mostly to support above changes)
  - Coexistence mechanisms for 20, 40, 80, and 160 MHz channels, 11ac and 11a/n devices
  - Adds four new fields to the PPDU header identifying the frame as a very high throughput (VHT) frame as opposed to 802.11n's high throughput (HT) or earlier. The first three fields in the header are readable by legacy devices to allow coexistence
  - DFS was mandated between channels 52 and 144 for 5 GHz to reduce interference with weather radar systems using the same frequency band.

== Features ==
=== Mandatory ===
- Borrowed from the 802.11a/802.11g specifications:
  - 800 ns regular guard interval
  - Binary convolutional coding (BCC)
  - Single spatial stream
- Newly introduced by the 802.11ac specification:
  - 80 MHz channel bandwidths

=== Optional ===
- Borrowed from the 802.11n specification:
  - Two to four spatial streams
  - Low-density parity-check code (LDPC)
  - Space–time block coding (STBC)
  - Transmit beamforming (TxBF)
  - 400 ns short guard interval (SGI)
- Newly introduced by the 802.11ac specification:
  - five to eight spatial streams
  - 160 MHz channel bandwidths (contiguous 80+80)
  - 80+80 MHz channel bonding (discontiguous 80+80)
  - MCS 8/9 (256-QAM)

== New scenarios and configurations ==
The single-link and multi-station enhancements supported by 802.11ac enable several new WLAN usage scenarios, such as simultaneous streaming of HD video to multiple clients throughout the home, rapid synchronization and backup of large data files, wireless display, large campus/auditorium deployments, and manufacturing floor automation.

To fully utilize their WLAN capacities, 802.11ac access points and routers have sufficient throughput to require the inclusion of a USB 3.0 interface to provide various services such as video streaming, FTP servers, and personal cloud services. With storage locally attached through USB 2.0, filling the bandwidth made available by 802.11ac was not easily accomplished.

=== Example configurations ===
All rates assume 256-QAM, rate 5/6:

Scenario	Typical client form factor	PHY link rate	Aggregate capacity (speed)
One-antenna AP, one-antenna STA, 80 MHz	Handheld	433 Mbit/s	433 Mbit/s
Two-antenna AP, two-antenna STA, 80 MHz	Tablet, laptop	867 Mbit/s	867 Mbit/s
One-antenna AP, one-antenna STA, 160 MHz	Handheld	867 Mbit/s	867 Mbit/s
Three-antenna AP, three-antenna STA, 80 MHz	Laptop, PC	1.30 Gbit/s	1.30 Gbit/s
Two-antenna AP, two-antenna STA, 160 MHz	Tablet, laptop	1.73 Gbit/s	1.73 Gbit/s
Four-antenna AP, four one-antenna STAs, 160 MHz (MU-MIMO)	Handheld	867 Mbit/s to each STA	3.39 Gbit/s
Eight-antenna AP, 160 MHz (MU-MIMO): one four-antenna STA; one two-antenna STA; two one-antenna STAs	Digital TV, set-top box, tablet, laptop, PC, handheld	3.47 Gbit/s to four-antenna STA; 1.73 Gbit/s to two-antenna STA; 867 Mbit/s to each one-antenna STA	6.93 Gbit/s
Eight-antenna AP, four 2-antenna STAs, 160 MHz (MU-MIMO)	Digital TV, tablet, laptop, PC	1.73 Gbit/s to each STA	6.93 Gbit/s

== Wave 1 vs. Wave 2 ==
Wave 2, referring to products introduced in 2016, offers a higher throughput than legacy Wave 1 products, those introduced starting in 2013. The maximum physical layer theoretical rate for Wave 1 is 1.3 Gbit/s, while Wave 2 can reach 2.34 Gbit/s. Wave 2 can therefore achieve 1 Gbit/s even if the real world throughput turns out to be only 50% of the theoretical rate. Wave 2 also supports a higher number of connected devices.

== Data rates and speed ==
Modulation and coding schemes
MCS index (Note: MCS 9 is not applicable to all channel width/spatial stream combinations.)	Spatial Streams	Modulation type	Coding rate	Data rate (Mbit/s)							
MCS index	Spatial Streams	Modulation type	Coding rate	20 MHz channels		40 MHz channels		80 MHz channels		160 MHz channels	
MCS index	Spatial Streams	Modulation type	Coding rate	800 ns GI	400 ns GI	800 ns GI	400 ns GI	800 ns GI	400 ns GI	800 ns GI	400 ns GI
0	1	BPSK	1/2	6.5	7.2	13.5	15	29.3	32.5	58.5	65
1	1	QPSK	1/2	13	14.4	27	30	58.5	65	117	130
2	1	QPSK	3/4	19.5	21.7	40.5	45	87.8	97.5	175.5	195
3	1	16-QAM	1/2	26	28.9	54	60	117	130	234	260
4	1	16-QAM	3/4	39	43.3	81	90	175.5	195	351	390
5	1	64-QAM	2/3	52	57.8	108	120	234	260	468	520
6	1	64-QAM	3/4	58.5	65	121.5	135	263.3	292.5	526.5	585
7	1	64-QAM	5/6	65	72.2	135	150	292.5	325	585	650
8	1	256-QAM	3/4	78	86.7	162	180	351	390	702	780
9	1	256-QAM	5/6	—N/a	—N/a	180	200	390	433.3	780	866.7
0	2	BPSK	1/2	13	14.4	27	30	58.5	65	117	130
1	2	QPSK	1/2	26	28.9	54	60	117	130	234	260
2	2	QPSK	3/4	39	43.3	81	90	175.5	195	351	390
3	2	16-QAM	1/2	52	57.8	108	120	234	260	468	520
4	2	16-QAM	3/4	78	86.7	162	180	351	390	702	780
5	2	64-QAM	2/3	104	115.6	216	240	468	520	936	1040
6	2	64-QAM	3/4	117	130.3	243	270	526.5	585	1053	1170
7	2	64-QAM	5/6	130	144.4	270	300	585	650	1170	1300
8	2	256-QAM	3/4	156	173.3	324	360	702	780	1404	1560
9	2	256-QAM	5/6	—N/a	—N/a	360	400	780	866.7	1560	1733.3
0	3	BPSK	1/2	19.5	21.7	40.5	45	87.8	97.5	175.5	195
1	3	QPSK	1/2	39	43.3	81	90	175.5	195	351	390
2	3	QPSK	3/4	58.5	65	121.5	135	263.3	292.5	526.5	585
3	3	16-QAM	1/2	78	86.7	162	180	351	390	702	780
4	3	16-QAM	3/4	117	130	243	270	526.6	585	1053	1170
5	3	64-QAM	2/3	156	173.3	324	360	702	780	1404	1560
6	3	64-QAM	3/4	175.5	195	364.5	405	789.9	877.5	1579.5	1755
7	3	64-QAM	5/6	195	216.7	405	450	877.5	975	1755	1950
8	3	256-QAM	3/4	234	260	486	540	1053	1170	2106	2340
9	3	256-QAM	5/6	—N/a	—N/a	540	600	1170	1300	2340	2600
0	4	BPSK	1/2	26	28.8	54	60	117.2	130	234	260
1	4	QPSK	1/2	52	57.6	108	120	234	260	468	520
2	4	QPSK	3/4	78	86.8	162	180	351.2	390	702	780
3	4	16-QAM	1/2	104	115.6	216	240	468	520	936	1040
4	4	16-QAM	3/4	156	173.2	324	360	702	780	1404	1560
5	4	64-QAM	2/3	208	231.2	432	480	936	1040	1872	2080
6	4	64-QAM	3/4	234	260	486	540	1053.2	1170	2106	2340
7	4	64-QAM	5/6	260	288.8	540	600	1170	1300	2340	2600
8	4	256-QAM	3/4	312	346.8	648	720	1404	1560	2808	3120
9	4	256-QAM	5/6	—N/a	—N/a	720	800	1560	1733.3	3120	3466.7

Several companies are currently offering 802.11ac chipsets with higher modulation rates: MCS-10 and MCS-11 (1024-QAM), supported by Quantenna and Broadcom. Although technically not part of 802.11ac, these new MCS indices became official in the 802.11ax standard, ratified in 2021.

160 MHz channels are unavailable in some countries due to regulatory issues that allocated some frequencies for other purposes.

=== Advertised speeds ===
802.11ac-class device wireless speeds are often advertised as AC followed by a number, that number being the highest link rates in Mbit/s of all the simultaneously usable radios in the device added up. For example, an AC1900 access point might have 600 Mbit/s capability on its 2.4 GHz radio and 1300 Mbit/s capability on its 5 GHz radio. No single client device could connect and achieve 1900 Mbit/s of throughput, but separate devices each connecting to the 2.4 GHz and 5 GHz radios could achieve combined throughput approaching 1900 Mbit/s. Different possible stream configurations can add up to the same AC number.

Type	2.4 GHz band Mbit/s	2.4 GHz band config [all 40 MHz]	5 GHz band Mbit/s	5 GHz band config [all 80 MHz]
AC450	-	-	433	1 stream @ MCS 9
AC600	150	1 stream @ MCS 7	433	1 stream @ MCS 9
AC750	300	2 streams @ MCS 7	433	1 stream @ MCS 9
AC1000	300	2 streams @ MCS 7	650	2 streams @ MCS 7
AC1200	300	2 streams @ MCS 7	867	2 streams @ MCS 9
AC1300	400	2 streams @ 256-QAM	867	2 streams @ MCS 9
AC1300	400	-	867	2 streams @ MCS 9
AC1350	450	3 streams @ MCS 7	867	2 streams @ MCS 9
AC1450	450	3 streams @ MCS 7	975	3 streams @ MCS 7
AC1600	300	2 streams @ MCS 7	1,300	3 streams @ MCS 9
AC1700	800	4 streams @ 256-QAM	867	2 streams @ MCS 9
AC1750	450	3 streams @ MCS 7	1,300	3 streams @ MCS 9
AC1900	600 (Note: While 600 Mbit/s in the 2.4 GHz band can be achieved by using four spatial streams at 150 Mbit/s each. Commercially available devices that achieve 600 Mbit/s in the 2.4 GHz band use 3 spatial streams at 200 Mbit/s each. This requires the use of 256-QAM modulation, which is not compliant with 802.11n and can be considered a proprietary extension.)	3 streams @ 256-QAM	1,300	3 streams @ MCS 9
AC2100	800	4 streams @ 256-QAM	1,300	3 streams @ MCS 9
AC2200	450	3 streams @ MCS 7	1,733	4 streams @ MCS 9
AC2300	600	4 streams @ MCS 7	1,625	3 streams @ 1024-QAM
AC2400	600	4 streams @ MCS 7	1,733	4 streams @ MCS 9
AC2600	800	4 streams @ 256-QAM	1,733	4 streams @ MCS 9
AC2900	750 (Note: With proprietary extension to 802.11n, using 40MHz channel in 2.4GHz, 400ns guard interval, and 1024-QAM.)	3 streams @ 1024-QAM	2,167	4 streams @ 1024-QAM
AC3000	450	3 streams @ MCS 7	1,300 + 1,300	3 streams @ MCS 9 x 2
AC3150	1000	4 streams @ 1024-QAM	2,167	4 streams @ 1024-QAM
AC3200	600	3 streams @ 256-QAM	1,300 + 1,300 (Note: Commercially available AC3200 devices use two separate radios with 1,300 Mbit/s each to achieve 2,600 Mbit/s total in the 5 GHz band.)	3 streams @ MCS 9 x 2
AC5000	600	4 streams @ MCS 7	2,167 + 2,167	4 streams @ 1024-QAM x 2
AC5300	1000	4 streams @ 1024-QAM	2,167 + 2,167	4 streams @ 1024-QAM x 2

== Comparison ==
802.11 network standards
Frequency range, or type	PHY	Protocol	Release date	Frequency band	Channel width	Stream data rate	Max. MIMO streams	Modulation	Approx. range	
Frequency range, or type	PHY	Protocol	Release date	Frequency band	Channel width	Stream data rate	Max. MIMO streams	Modulation	Indoor	Outdoor
Frequency range, or type	PHY	Protocol	Release date	(GHz)	(MHz)	(Mbit/s)	Max. MIMO streams	Modulation	Indoor	Outdoor
1–7 GHz	DSSS, ~~FHSS~~ (Note: This is obsolete, and support for this might be subject to removal in a future revision of the standard)	802.11-1997	June 1997	2.4	22	1, 2	—N/a	DSSS, ~~FHSS~~	20 m (66 ft)	100 m (330 ft)
1–7 GHz	HR/DSSS	802.11b	September 1999	2.4	22	1, 2, 5.5, 11	—N/a	CCK, DSSS	35 m (115 ft)	140 m (460 ft)
1–7 GHz	OFDM	802.11a	September 1999	5	5, 10, 20	6, 9, 12, 18, 24, 36, 48, 54 (for 20 MHz bandwidth, divide by 2 and 4 for 10 and 5 MHz)	—N/a	OFDM	35 m (115 ft)	120 m (390 ft)
1–7 GHz	OFDM	802.11j	November 2004	4.9, 5.0 (Note: For Japanese regulation.)	5, 10, 20	6, 9, 12, 18, 24, 36, 48, 54 (for 20 MHz bandwidth, divide by 2 and 4 for 10 and 5 MHz)	—N/a	OFDM	?	?
1–7 GHz	OFDM	802.11y	November 2008	3.7 (Note: IEEE 802.11y-2008 extended operation of 802.11a to the licensed 3.7 GHz band. Increased power limits allow a range up to 5,000 m. As of 2009, it is only being licensed in the United States by the FCC.)	5, 10, 20	6, 9, 12, 18, 24, 36, 48, 54 (for 20 MHz bandwidth, divide by 2 and 4 for 10 and 5 MHz)	—N/a	OFDM	?	5,000 m (16,000 ft)
1–7 GHz	OFDM	802.11p	July 2010	5.9	5, 10, 20	6, 9, 12, 18, 24, 36, 48, 54 (for 20 MHz bandwidth, divide by 2 and 4 for 10 and 5 MHz)	—N/a	OFDM	200 m	1,000 m (3,300 ft)
1–7 GHz	OFDM	802.11bd	December 2022	5.9, 60	5, 10, 20	6, 9, 12, 18, 24, 36, 48, 54 (for 20 MHz bandwidth, divide by 2 and 4 for 10 and 5 MHz)	—N/a	OFDM	500 m	1,000 m (3,300 ft)
1–7 GHz	ERP-OFDM	802.11g	June 2003	2.4	5, 10, 20	6, 9, 12, 18, 24, 36, 48, 54 (for 20 MHz bandwidth, divide by 2 and 4 for 10 and 5 MHz)	—N/a	OFDM	38 m (125 ft)	140 m (460 ft)
1–7 GHz	HT-OFDM	802.11n (Wi-Fi 4)	October 2009	2.4, 5	20	Up to 288.8 (Note: Based on short guard interval; standard guard interval is ~10% slower. Rates vary widely based on distance, obstructions, and interference.)	4	MIMO-OFDM (64-QAM)	70 m (230 ft)	250 m (820 ft)
1–7 GHz	HT-OFDM	802.11n (Wi-Fi 4)	October 2009	2.4, 5	40	Up to 600	4	MIMO-OFDM (64-QAM)	70 m (230 ft)	250 m (820 ft)
1–7 GHz	VHT-OFDM	802.11ac (Wi-Fi 5)	December 2013	5	20	Up to 693	8	DL; MU-MIMO OFDM (256-QAM)	35 m (115 ft)	?
1–7 GHz	VHT-OFDM	802.11ac (Wi-Fi 5)	December 2013	5	40	Up to 1,600	8	DL; MU-MIMO OFDM (256-QAM)	35 m (115 ft)	?
1–7 GHz	VHT-OFDM	802.11ac (Wi-Fi 5)	December 2013	5	80	Up to 3,467	8	DL; MU-MIMO OFDM (256-QAM)	35 m (115 ft)	?
1–7 GHz	VHT-OFDM	802.11ac (Wi-Fi 5)	December 2013	5	160	Up to 6,933	8	DL; MU-MIMO OFDM (256-QAM)	35 m (115 ft)	?
1–7 GHz	HE-OFDMA	802.11ax (Wi-Fi 6, Wi-Fi 6E)	May 2021	2.4, 5, 6	20	Up to 1,147 (Note: For single-user cases only, based on default guard interval which is 0.8 microseconds. Since multi-user via OFDMA has become available for 802.11ax, these may decrease. Also, these theoretical values depend on the link distance, whether the link is line-of-sight or not, interferences and the multi-path components in the environment.)	8	UL/DL; MU-MIMO OFDMA (1024-QAM)	30 m (98 ft)	120 m (390 ft) (Note: The default guard interval is 0.8 microseconds. However, 802.11ax extended the maximum available guard interval to 3.2 microseconds, in order to support outdoor communications, where the maximum possible propagation delay is larger compared to Indoor environments.)
1–7 GHz	HE-OFDMA	802.11ax (Wi-Fi 6, Wi-Fi 6E)	May 2021	2.4, 5, 6	40	Up to 2,294	8	UL/DL; MU-MIMO OFDMA (1024-QAM)	30 m (98 ft)	120 m (390 ft)
1–7 GHz	HE-OFDMA	802.11ax (Wi-Fi 6, Wi-Fi 6E)	May 2021	2.4, 5, 6	80	Up to 5,500	8	UL/DL; MU-MIMO OFDMA (1024-QAM)	30 m (98 ft)	120 m (390 ft)
1–7 GHz	HE-OFDMA	802.11ax (Wi-Fi 6, Wi-Fi 6E)	May 2021	2.4, 5, 6	80+80	Up to 11,000	8	UL/DL; MU-MIMO OFDMA (1024-QAM)	30 m (98 ft)	120 m (390 ft)
1–7 GHz	EHT-OFDMA	802.11be (Wi-Fi 7)	Sep 2024	2.4, 5, 6	80	Up to 5,764	8	UL/DL; MU-MIMO OFDMA (4096-QAM)	30 m (98 ft)	120 m (390 ft)
1–7 GHz	EHT-OFDMA	802.11be (Wi-Fi 7)	Sep 2024	2.4, 5, 6	160 (80+80)	Up to 11,500	8	UL/DL; MU-MIMO OFDMA (4096-QAM)	30 m (98 ft)	120 m (390 ft)
1–7 GHz	EHT-OFDMA	802.11be (Wi-Fi 7)	Sep 2024	2.4, 5, 6	240 (160+80)	Up to 14,282	8	UL/DL; MU-MIMO OFDMA (4096-QAM)	30 m (98 ft)	120 m (390 ft)
1–7 GHz	EHT-OFDMA	802.11be (Wi-Fi 7)	Sep 2024	2.4, 5, 6	320 (160+160)	Up to 23,059	8	UL/DL; MU-MIMO OFDMA (4096-QAM)	30 m (98 ft)	120 m (390 ft)
1–7 GHz	UHR	802.11bn (Wi-Fi 8)	May 2028 (est.)	2.4, 5, 6	320	Up to 23,059	8	Multi-link; MU-MIMO OFDM (4096-QAM)	?	?
1–7 GHz	WUR (Note: Wake-up Radio (WUR) Operation.)	802.11ba	October 2021	2.4, 5	4, 20	0.0625, 0.25 (62.5 kbit/s, 250 kbit/s)	—N/a	OOK (multi-carrier OOK)	?	?
mmWave (WiGig)	DMG	802.11ad	December 2012	60	2,160 (2.16 GHz)	Up to 8,085 (8 Gbit/s)	—N/a	~~OFDM~~, single carrier, low-power single carrier	3.3 m (11 ft)	?
mmWave (WiGig)	DMG	802.11aj	April 2018	60 (Note: For Chinese regulation.)	1,080	Up to 3,754 (3.75 Gbit/s)	—N/a	single carrier, low-power single carrier	?	?
mmWave (WiGig)	CMMG	802.11aj	April 2018	45	540, 1,080	Up to 15,015 (15 Gbit/s)	4	OFDM, single carrier	?	?
mmWave (WiGig)	EDMG	802.11ay	July 2021	60	Up to 8,640 (8.64 GHz)	Up to 303,336 (303 Gbit/s)	8	OFDM, single carrier	10 m (33 ft)	100 m (328 ft)
Sub 1 GHz (IoT)	TVHT	802.11af	February 2014	0.054– 0.79	6, 7, 8	Up to 568.9	4	MIMO-OFDM	?	?
Sub 1 GHz (IoT)	S1G	802.11ah	May 2017	0.7, 0.8, 0.9	1–16	Up to 8.67 (@2 MHz)	4	MIMO-OFDM	?	?
Light (Li-Fi)	LC (VLC/OWC)	802.11bb	November 2023	800–1000 nm	20	Up to 9.6 Gbit/s	—N/a	O-OFDM	?	?
Light (Li-Fi)	~~IR~~ (IrDA)	802.11-1997	June 1997	850–900 nm	?	1, 2	—N/a	~~PPM~~	?	?
802.11 Standard rollups
		802.11-2007 (802.11ma)	March 2007	2.4, 5		Up to 54		DSSS, OFDM		
		802.11-2012 (802.11mb)	March 2012	2.4, 5		Up to 150		DSSS, OFDM		
		802.11-2016 (802.11mc)	December 2016	2.4, 5, 60		Up to 866.7 or 6,757		DSSS, OFDM		
		802.11-2020 (802.11md)	December 2020	2.4, 5, 60		Up to 866.7 or 6,757		DSSS, OFDM		
		802.11-2024 (802.11me)	September 2024	2.4, 5, 6, 60		Up to 9,608 or 303,336		DSSS, OFDM		

== See also ==
- IEEE 802.11ad
