= IEEE 802.11g-2003 =

Wireless networking standard

Wi-Fi generations
Gen.	IEEE standard	Adopt.	Link rate (Mbit/s)	RF (GHz)		
Gen.	IEEE standard	Adopt.	Link rate (Mbit/s)	2.4	5	6
Wi-Fi 1	802.11	1997	1–2	Yes		
Wi-Fi 2	802.11b	1999	1–11	Yes		
Wi-Fi 2G	802.11a	1999	6–54		Yes	
Wi-Fi 3	802.11g	2003	6–54	Yes		
Wi-Fi 4	802.11n	2009	6.5–600	Yes	Yes	
Wi-Fi 5	802.11ac	2013	6.5–6,933	(Note: 802.11ac only specifies operation in the 5 GHz band. Operation in the 2.4 GHz band is specified by 802.11n.)	Yes	
Wi-Fi 6	802.11ax	2021	0.4–9,608	Yes	Yes	
Wi-Fi 6E	802.11ax	2021	0.4–9,608	Yes	Yes	Yes
Wi-Fi 7	802.11be	2024	0.4–23,059	Yes	Yes	Yes
Wi-Fi 8	802.11bn	TBA	0.4–23,059	Yes	Yes	Yes

IEEE 802.11g-2003 or 802.11g is an amendment to the IEEE 802.11 specification that operates in the 2.4 GHz microwave band. The standard has extended link rate to up to 54 Mbit/s using the same 20 MHz bandwidth as 802.11b uses to achieve 11 Mbit/s. This specification, under the marketing name of Wi‑Fi, has been implemented all over the world. The 802.11g protocol is now Clause 19 of the published IEEE 802.11-2007 standard, and Clause 19 of the published IEEE 802.11-2012 standard.

802.11 is a set of IEEE standards that govern wireless networking transmission methods. They are commonly used today in their 802.11a, 802.11b, 802.11g, 802.11n, 802.11ac and 802.11ax versions to provide wireless connectivity in the home, office and some commercial establishments.

802.11g is fully backward compatible with 802.11b, but coexistence of the two methods creates a significant performance penalty.

== Descriptions ==
802.11g is the third modulation standard for wireless LANs. It works in the 2.4 GHz band (like 802.11b) but operates at a maximum raw data rate of 54 Mbit/s. Using the CSMA/CA transmission scheme, 31.4 Mbit/s is the maximum net throughput possible for packets of 1500 bytes in size and a 54 Mbit/s wireless rate (identical to 802.11a core, except for some additional legacy overhead for backward compatibility). In practice, access points may not have an ideal implementation and may therefore not be able to achieve even 31.4 Mbit/s throughput with 1500 byte packets. 1500 bytes is the usual limit for packets on the Internet and therefore a relevant size to benchmark against. Smaller packets give even lower theoretical throughput, down to 3 Mbit/s using 54 Mbit/s rate and 64 byte packets. Also, the available throughput is shared between all stations transmitting, including the AP so both downstream and upstream traffic is limited to a shared total of 31.4 Mbit/s using 1500 byte packets and 54 Mbit/s rate.

802.11g hardware is fully backward compatible with 802.11b hardware. Details of making b and g work well together occupied much of the lingering technical process. In an 802.11g network, however, the presence of a legacy 802.11b participant will significantly reduce the speed of the overall 802.11g network, as airtime needs to be managed by RTS/CTS transmissions and a "back off" mechanism. Some 802.11g routers employ a back-compatible mode for 802.11b clients called 54g LRS (Limited Rate Support).

The modulation scheme used in 802.11g is orthogonal frequency-division multiplexing (OFDM) copied from 802.11a with data rates of 6, 9, 12, 18, 24, 36, 48, and 54 Mbit/s, and reverts to CCK (like the 802.11b standard) for 5.5 and 11 Mbit/s and DBPSK/DQPSK+DSSS for 1 and 2 Mbit/s. Even though 802.11g operates in the same frequency band as 802.11b, it can achieve higher data rates because of its better modulation from 802.11a.

== Technical description ==
Of the 52 OFDM subcarriers, 48 are for data and 4 are pilot subcarriers with a carrier separation of 0.3125 MHz (20 MHz/64). Each of these subcarriers can be a BPSK, QPSK, 16-QAM or 64-QAM. The total bandwidth is 22 MHz with an occupied bandwidth of 16.6 MHz. Symbol duration is 4 microseconds, which includes a guard interval of 0.8 microseconds. The actual generation and decoding of orthogonal components is done in baseband using DSP which is then upconverted to 2.4 GHz at the transmitter. Each of the subcarriers could be represented as a complex number. The time domain signal is generated by taking an Inverse Fast Fourier transform (IFFT). Correspondingly the receiver downconverts, samples at 20 MHz and does an FFT to retrieve the original coefficients. The advantages of using OFDM include reduced multipath effects in reception and increased spectral efficiency.

MCS index(read as little endian)	RATE bits R1-R4	Modulation type	Coding rate	Data rate (Mbit/s)
11	1101	BPSK	1/2	6
15	1111	BPSK	3/4	9
10	0101	QPSK	1/2	12
14	0111	QPSK	3/4	18
9	1001	16-QAM	1/2	24
13	1011	16-QAM	3/4	36
8	0001	64-QAM	2/3	48
12	0011	64-QAM	3/4	54

== Adoption ==
Die shot of a Broadcom BCM2050KMLG, an RF CMOS chip used as a WiFi 802.11g radio

The then-proposed 802.11g standard was rapidly adopted by consumers starting in January 2003, well before ratification, due to the desire for higher speeds and reductions in manufacturing costs. By mid-2003, most dual-band 802.11a/b products became dual-band/tri-mode, supporting a and b/g in a single mobile adapter card or access point.

Despite its major acceptance, 802.11g suffers from the same interference as 802.11b in the already crowded 2.4 GHz range. Devices operating in this range include microwave ovens, Bluetooth devices, baby monitors, and digital cordless telephones, which can lead to interference issues. Additionally, the success of the standard has caused usage/density problems related to crowding in urban areas. To prevent interference, there are only three non-overlapping usable channels in the U.S. and other countries with similar regulations (channels 1, 6, 11, with 25 MHz separation), and four in Europe (channels 1, 5, 9, 13, with only 20 MHz separation). Even with such separation, some interference due to side lobes exists, though it is considerably weaker.

== Channels and frequencies ==
Graphical representation of Wireless LAN channels in 2.4 GHz band. Channels 12 and 13 are customarily unused in the United States. As a result, the usual 20 MHz allocation becomes 1/6/11, the same as 11b.

IEEE 802.11g channel to frequency map
Channel	Center frequency (GHz)	Span (GHz)	Overlapping channels
1	2.412	2.401–2.423	2, 3, 4, 5*
2	2.417	2.406–2.428	1, 3, 4, 5, 6*
3	2.422	2.411–2.433	1, 2, 4, 5, 6, 7*
4	2.427	2.416–2.438	1, 2, 3, 5, 6, 7, 8*
5	2.432	2.421–2.443	1*, 2, 3, 4, 6, 7, 8, 9*
6	2.437	2.426–2.448	2*, 3, 4, 5, 7, 8, 9, 10*
7	2.442	2.431–2.453	3*, 4, 5, 6, 8, 9, 10, 11*
8	2.447	2.436–2.458	4*, 5, 6, 7, 9, 10, 11, 12*
9	2.452	2.441–2.463	5*, 6, 7, 8, 10, 11, 12, 13*
10	2.457	2.446–2.468	6*, 7, 8, 9, 11, 12, 13*
11	2.462	2.451–2.473	7*, 8, 9, 10, 12, 13*
12	2.467	2.456–2.478	8*, 9, 10, 11, 13, 14*
13	2.472	2.461–2.483	9*, 10, 11, 12, 14*
14	2.484	2.473–2.495	12, 13

Notes:

- Not all channels are legal to use in all countries. In particular, no countries in the world permit the use of channel 14 for 802.11g. Channels 12 and 13 are avoided in the United States due to a misinterpretation of regulations.
- Overlaps noted with an asterisk (*) indicate overlap only in the 22 MHz width, while 802.11g only requires 20 MHz (the actual occupied bandwidth is even lower, 16.25 MHz). As a result, such overlaps have minimal performance implications.

== Comparison ==
Click on "show".

802.11 network standards
Frequency range, or type	PHY	Protocol	Release date	Frequency band	Channel width	Stream data rate	Max. MIMO streams	Modulation	Approx. range	
Frequency range, or type	PHY	Protocol	Release date	Frequency band	Channel width	Stream data rate	Max. MIMO streams	Modulation	Indoor	Outdoor
Frequency range, or type	PHY	Protocol	Release date	(GHz)	(MHz)	(Mbit/s)	Max. MIMO streams	Modulation	Indoor	Outdoor
1–7 GHz	DSSS, ~~FHSS~~ (Note: This is obsolete, and support for this might be subject to removal in a future revision of the standard)	802.11-1997	June 1997	2.4	22	1, 2	—N/a	DSSS, ~~FHSS~~	20 m (66 ft)	100 m (330 ft)
1–7 GHz	HR/DSSS	802.11b	September 1999	2.4	22	1, 2, 5.5, 11	—N/a	CCK, DSSS	35 m (115 ft)	140 m (460 ft)
1–7 GHz	OFDM	802.11a	September 1999	5	5, 10, 20	6, 9, 12, 18, 24, 36, 48, 54 (for 20 MHz bandwidth, divide by 2 and 4 for 10 and 5 MHz)	—N/a	OFDM	35 m (115 ft)	120 m (390 ft)
1–7 GHz	OFDM	802.11j	November 2004	4.9, 5.0 (Note: For Japanese regulation.)	5, 10, 20	6, 9, 12, 18, 24, 36, 48, 54 (for 20 MHz bandwidth, divide by 2 and 4 for 10 and 5 MHz)	—N/a	OFDM	?	?
1–7 GHz	OFDM	802.11y	November 2008	3.7 (Note: IEEE 802.11y-2008 extended operation of 802.11a to the licensed 3.7 GHz band. Increased power limits allow a range up to 5,000 m. As of 2009, it is only being licensed in the United States by the FCC.)	5, 10, 20	6, 9, 12, 18, 24, 36, 48, 54 (for 20 MHz bandwidth, divide by 2 and 4 for 10 and 5 MHz)	—N/a	OFDM	?	5,000 m (16,000 ft)
1–7 GHz	OFDM	802.11p	July 2010	5.9	5, 10, 20	6, 9, 12, 18, 24, 36, 48, 54 (for 20 MHz bandwidth, divide by 2 and 4 for 10 and 5 MHz)	—N/a	OFDM	200 m	1,000 m (3,300 ft)
1–7 GHz	OFDM	802.11bd	December 2022	5.9, 60	5, 10, 20	6, 9, 12, 18, 24, 36, 48, 54 (for 20 MHz bandwidth, divide by 2 and 4 for 10 and 5 MHz)	—N/a	OFDM	500 m	1,000 m (3,300 ft)
1–7 GHz	ERP-OFDM	802.11g	June 2003	2.4	5, 10, 20	6, 9, 12, 18, 24, 36, 48, 54 (for 20 MHz bandwidth, divide by 2 and 4 for 10 and 5 MHz)	—N/a	OFDM	38 m (125 ft)	140 m (460 ft)
1–7 GHz	HT-OFDM	802.11n (Wi-Fi 4)	October 2009	2.4, 5	20	Up to 288.8 (Note: Based on short guard interval; standard guard interval is ~10% slower. Rates vary widely based on distance, obstructions, and interference.)	4	MIMO-OFDM (64-QAM)	70 m (230 ft)	250 m (820 ft)
1–7 GHz	HT-OFDM	802.11n (Wi-Fi 4)	October 2009	2.4, 5	40	Up to 600	4	MIMO-OFDM (64-QAM)	70 m (230 ft)	250 m (820 ft)
1–7 GHz	VHT-OFDM	802.11ac (Wi-Fi 5)	December 2013	5	20	Up to 693	8	DL; MU-MIMO OFDM (256-QAM)	35 m (115 ft)	?
1–7 GHz	VHT-OFDM	802.11ac (Wi-Fi 5)	December 2013	5	40	Up to 1,600	8	DL; MU-MIMO OFDM (256-QAM)	35 m (115 ft)	?
1–7 GHz	VHT-OFDM	802.11ac (Wi-Fi 5)	December 2013	5	80	Up to 3,467	8	DL; MU-MIMO OFDM (256-QAM)	35 m (115 ft)	?
1–7 GHz	VHT-OFDM	802.11ac (Wi-Fi 5)	December 2013	5	160	Up to 6,933	8	DL; MU-MIMO OFDM (256-QAM)	35 m (115 ft)	?
1–7 GHz	HE-OFDMA	802.11ax (Wi-Fi 6, Wi-Fi 6E)	May 2021	2.4, 5, 6	20	Up to 1,147 (Note: For single-user cases only, based on default guard interval which is 0.8 microseconds. Since multi-user via OFDMA has become available for 802.11ax, these may decrease. Also, these theoretical values depend on the link distance, whether the link is line-of-sight or not, interferences and the multi-path components in the environment.)	8	UL/DL; MU-MIMO OFDMA (1024-QAM)	30 m (98 ft)	120 m (390 ft) (Note: The default guard interval is 0.8 microseconds. However, 802.11ax extended the maximum available guard interval to 3.2 microseconds, in order to support outdoor communications, where the maximum possible propagation delay is larger compared to Indoor environments.)
1–7 GHz	HE-OFDMA	802.11ax (Wi-Fi 6, Wi-Fi 6E)	May 2021	2.4, 5, 6	40	Up to 2,294	8	UL/DL; MU-MIMO OFDMA (1024-QAM)	30 m (98 ft)	120 m (390 ft)
1–7 GHz	HE-OFDMA	802.11ax (Wi-Fi 6, Wi-Fi 6E)	May 2021	2.4, 5, 6	80	Up to 5,500	8	UL/DL; MU-MIMO OFDMA (1024-QAM)	30 m (98 ft)	120 m (390 ft)
1–7 GHz	HE-OFDMA	802.11ax (Wi-Fi 6, Wi-Fi 6E)	May 2021	2.4, 5, 6	80+80	Up to 11,000	8	UL/DL; MU-MIMO OFDMA (1024-QAM)	30 m (98 ft)	120 m (390 ft)
1–7 GHz	EHT-OFDMA	802.11be (Wi-Fi 7)	Sep 2024	2.4, 5, 6	80	Up to 5,764	8	UL/DL; MU-MIMO OFDMA (4096-QAM)	30 m (98 ft)	120 m (390 ft)
1–7 GHz	EHT-OFDMA	802.11be (Wi-Fi 7)	Sep 2024	2.4, 5, 6	160 (80+80)	Up to 11,500	8	UL/DL; MU-MIMO OFDMA (4096-QAM)	30 m (98 ft)	120 m (390 ft)
1–7 GHz	EHT-OFDMA	802.11be (Wi-Fi 7)	Sep 2024	2.4, 5, 6	240 (160+80)	Up to 14,282	8	UL/DL; MU-MIMO OFDMA (4096-QAM)	30 m (98 ft)	120 m (390 ft)
1–7 GHz	EHT-OFDMA	802.11be (Wi-Fi 7)	Sep 2024	2.4, 5, 6	320 (160+160)	Up to 23,059	8	UL/DL; MU-MIMO OFDMA (4096-QAM)	30 m (98 ft)	120 m (390 ft)
1–7 GHz	UHR	802.11bn (Wi-Fi 8)	May 2028 (est.)	2.4, 5, 6	320	Up to 23,059	8	Multi-link; MU-MIMO OFDM (4096-QAM)	?	?
1–7 GHz	WUR (Note: Wake-up Radio (WUR) Operation.)	802.11ba	October 2021	2.4, 5	4, 20	0.0625, 0.25 (62.5 kbit/s, 250 kbit/s)	—N/a	OOK (multi-carrier OOK)	?	?
mmWave (WiGig)	DMG	802.11ad	December 2012	60	2,160 (2.16 GHz)	Up to 8,085 (8 Gbit/s)	—N/a	~~OFDM~~, single carrier, low-power single carrier	3.3 m (11 ft)	?
mmWave (WiGig)	DMG	802.11aj	April 2018	60 (Note: For Chinese regulation.)	1,080	Up to 3,754 (3.75 Gbit/s)	—N/a	single carrier, low-power single carrier	?	?
mmWave (WiGig)	CMMG	802.11aj	April 2018	45	540, 1,080	Up to 15,015 (15 Gbit/s)	4	OFDM, single carrier	?	?
mmWave (WiGig)	EDMG	802.11ay	July 2021	60	Up to 8,640 (8.64 GHz)	Up to 303,336 (303 Gbit/s)	8	OFDM, single carrier	10 m (33 ft)	100 m (328 ft)
Sub 1 GHz (IoT)	TVHT	802.11af	February 2014	0.054– 0.79	6, 7, 8	Up to 568.9	4	MIMO-OFDM	?	?
Sub 1 GHz (IoT)	S1G	802.11ah	May 2017	0.7, 0.8, 0.9	1–16	Up to 8.67 (@2 MHz)	4	MIMO-OFDM	?	?
Light (Li-Fi)	LC (VLC/OWC)	802.11bb	November 2023	800–1000 nm	20	Up to 9.6 Gbit/s	—N/a	O-OFDM	?	?
Light (Li-Fi)	~~IR~~ (IrDA)	802.11-1997	June 1997	850–900 nm	?	1, 2	—N/a	~~PPM~~	?	?
802.11 Standard rollups
		802.11-2007 (802.11ma)	March 2007	2.4, 5		Up to 54		DSSS, OFDM		
		802.11-2012 (802.11mb)	March 2012	2.4, 5		Up to 150		DSSS, OFDM		
		802.11-2016 (802.11mc)	December 2016	2.4, 5, 60		Up to 866.7 or 6,757		DSSS, OFDM		
		802.11-2020 (802.11md)	December 2020	2.4, 5, 60		Up to 866.7 or 6,757		DSSS, OFDM		
		802.11-2024 (802.11me)	September 2024	2.4, 5, 6, 60		Up to 9,608 or 303,336		DSSS, OFDM		

== See also ==
- Clear channel assessment attack
- List of WLAN channels
- OFDM system comparison table
- Spectral efficiency comparison table
- Wi-Fi
- Super G (wireless networking)
- Xpress technology
