= IEEE 802.11b-1999 =

Wireless networking standard

Wi-Fi and IEEE 802.11 generations
Genera- tion	IEEE standard	Adopt- ed	Link rate (Mbit/s)	Frequency (GHz)		
Genera- tion	IEEE standard	Adopt- ed	Link rate (Mbit/s)	2.4	5	6
—	802.11	1997	1–2	Yes		
—	802.11b	1999	1–11	Yes		
—	802.11a	1999	6–54		Yes	
—	802.11g	2003	6–54	Yes		
Wi-Fi 4	802.11n	2009	6.5–600	Yes	Yes	
Wi-Fi 5	802.11ac	2013	6.5–6,933	(Note: 802.11ac only specifies operation in the 5 GHz band. Operation in the 2.4 GHz band is specified by 802.11n.)	Yes	
Wi-Fi 6	802.11ax	2021	0.4–9,608	Yes	Yes	
Wi-Fi 6E	802.11ax	2021	0.4–9,608	Yes	Yes	Yes
Wi-Fi 7	802.11be	2024	0.4–23,059	Yes	Yes	Yes
Wi-Fi 8	802.11bn	TBA	0.4–23,059	Yes	Yes	Yes

IEEE 802.11b-1999 or 802.11b is an amendment to the IEEE 802.11 wireless networking specification that extends throughput up to 11 Mbit/s using the same 2.4 GHz band. A related amendment was incorporated into the IEEE 802.11-2007 standard.

802.11 is a set of IEEE standards that govern wireless networking transmission methods. They are commonly used today in their 802.11a, 802.11b, 802.11g, 802.11n, 802.11ac and 802.11ax versions to provide wireless connectivity in the home, office and some commercial establishments.

== Description ==
802.11b has a maximum raw data rate of 11 Mbit/s and uses the same CSMA/CA media access method defined in the original standard. Due to the CSMA/CA protocol overhead, in practice the maximum 802.11b throughput that an application can achieve is about 5.9 Mbit/s using TCP and 7.1 Mbit/s using UDP.

802.11b products appeared on the market in mid-1999, since 802.11b is a direct extension of the DSSS (Direct-sequence spread spectrum) modulation technique defined in the original standard. The Apple iBook was the first mainstream computer sold with optional 802.11b networking. Technically, the 802.11b standard uses complementary code keying (CCK) as its modulation technique, which uses a specific set of length 8 complementary codes that was originally designed for OFDM but was also suitable for use in 802.11b because of its low autocorrelation properties. The dramatic increase in throughput of 802.11b (compared to the original standard) along with simultaneous substantial price reductions led to the rapid acceptance of 802.11b as the definitive wireless LAN technology as well as to the formation of the Wi-Fi Alliance.

802.11b devices suffer interference from other products operating in the 2.4 GHz band. Devices operating in the 2.4 GHz range include: microwave ovens, Bluetooth devices, baby monitors and cordless telephones. Interference issues and user density problems within the 2.4 GHz band have become a major concern and frustration for users.

Code Length bits	Modulation type	Symbol Rate	Bit per Symbol	Data rate (Mbit/s)
11-bit Barker code	BPSK	11/11 = 1	1	1
11-bit Barker code	DBPSK	11/11 = 1	2	2
8-bit CCK	QPSK	11/8 = 1.375	4	5.5
8-bit CCK	DQPSK	11/8 = 1.375	8	11

== Range ==
802.11b is used in a point-to-multipoint configuration, wherein an access point communicates via an omnidirectional antenna with mobile clients within the range of the access point. Typical range depends on the radio frequency environment, output power and sensitivity of the receiver. Allowable bandwidth is shared across clients in discrete channels. A directional antenna focuses transmit and receive power into a smaller field which reduces interference and increases point-to-point range. Designers of such installations who wish to remain within the law must however be careful about legal limitations on effective radiated power.

Some 802.11b cards operate at 11 Mbit/s, but scale back to 5.5, then to 2, then to 1 Mbit/s (also known as Adaptive Rate Selection) in order to decrease the rate of re-broadcasts that result from errors.

== Channels and frequencies ==
802.11b/g channels in 2.4 GHz band

channel to frequency map
Channel	Center frequency	Frequency delta	Channel width	Overlaps channels
1	2.412 GHz	5 MHz	2.401–2.423 GHz	2-5
2	2.417 GHz	5 MHz	2.406–2.428 GHz	1,3-6
3	2.422 GHz	5 MHz	2.411–2.433 GHz	1–2,4-7
4	2.427 GHz	5 MHz	2.416–2.438 GHz	1–3,5-8
5	2.432 GHz	5 MHz	2.421–2.443 GHz	1–4,6-9
6	2.437 GHz	5 MHz	2.426–2.448 GHz	2–5,7-10
7	2.442 GHz	5 MHz	2.431–2.453 GHz	3–6,8-11
8	2.447 GHz	5 MHz	2.436–2.458 GHz	4–7,9-12
9	2.452 GHz	5 MHz	2.441–2.463 GHz	5–8,10-13
10	2.457 GHz	5 MHz	2.446–2.468 GHz	6–9,11-13
11	2.462 GHz	5 MHz	2.451–2.473 GHz	7-10,12-13
12	2.467 GHz	5 MHz	2.456–2.478 GHz	8-11,13-14
13	2.472 GHz	5 MHz	2.461–2.483 GHz	9-12, 14
14	2.484 GHz	12 MHz	2.473–2.495 GHz	12-13

Note: Channel 14 is only allowed in Japan, Channels 12 & 13 are allowed in most parts of the world. More information can be found in the List of WLAN channels.

== Comparison ==
802.11 network standards
Frequency range, or type	PHY	Protocol	Release date	Frequency band	Channel width	Stream data rate	Max. MIMO streams	Modulation	Approx. range	
Frequency range, or type	PHY	Protocol	Release date	Frequency band	Channel width	Stream data rate	Max. MIMO streams	Modulation	Indoor	Outdoor
Frequency range, or type	PHY	Protocol	Release date	(GHz)	(MHz)	(Mbit/s)	Max. MIMO streams	Modulation	Indoor	Outdoor
1–7 GHz	DSSS, ~~FHSS~~ (Note: This is obsolete, and support for this might be subject to removal in a future revision of the standard)	802.11-1997	June 1997	2.4	22	1, 2	—N/a	DSSS, ~~FHSS~~	20 m (66 ft)	100 m (330 ft)
1–7 GHz	HR/DSSS	802.11b	September 1999	2.4	22	1, 2, 5.5, 11	—N/a	CCK, DSSS	35 m (115 ft)	140 m (460 ft)
1–7 GHz	OFDM	802.11a	September 1999	5	5, 10, 20	6, 9, 12, 18, 24, 36, 48, 54 (for 20 MHz bandwidth, divide by 2 and 4 for 10 and 5 MHz)	—N/a	OFDM	35 m (115 ft)	120 m (390 ft)
1–7 GHz	OFDM	802.11j	November 2004	4.9, 5.0 (Note: For Japanese regulation.)	5, 10, 20	6, 9, 12, 18, 24, 36, 48, 54 (for 20 MHz bandwidth, divide by 2 and 4 for 10 and 5 MHz)	—N/a	OFDM	?	?
1–7 GHz	OFDM	802.11y	November 2008	3.7 (Note: IEEE 802.11y-2008 extended operation of 802.11a to the licensed 3.7 GHz band. Increased power limits allow a range up to 5,000 m. As of 2009, it is only being licensed in the United States by the FCC.)	5, 10, 20	6, 9, 12, 18, 24, 36, 48, 54 (for 20 MHz bandwidth, divide by 2 and 4 for 10 and 5 MHz)	—N/a	OFDM	?	5,000 m (16,000 ft)
1–7 GHz	OFDM	802.11p	July 2010	5.9	5, 10, 20	6, 9, 12, 18, 24, 36, 48, 54 (for 20 MHz bandwidth, divide by 2 and 4 for 10 and 5 MHz)	—N/a	OFDM	200 m	1,000 m (3,300 ft)
1–7 GHz	OFDM	802.11bd	December 2022	5.9, 60	5, 10, 20	6, 9, 12, 18, 24, 36, 48, 54 (for 20 MHz bandwidth, divide by 2 and 4 for 10 and 5 MHz)	—N/a	OFDM	500 m	1,000 m (3,300 ft)
1–7 GHz	ERP-OFDM	802.11g	June 2003	2.4	5, 10, 20	6, 9, 12, 18, 24, 36, 48, 54 (for 20 MHz bandwidth, divide by 2 and 4 for 10 and 5 MHz)	—N/a	OFDM	38 m (125 ft)	140 m (460 ft)
1–7 GHz	HT-OFDM	802.11n (Wi-Fi 4)	October 2009	2.4, 5	20	Up to 288.8 (Note: Based on short guard interval; standard guard interval is ~10% slower. Rates vary widely based on distance, obstructions, and interference.)	4	MIMO-OFDM (64-QAM)	70 m (230 ft)	250 m (820 ft)
1–7 GHz	HT-OFDM	802.11n (Wi-Fi 4)	October 2009	2.4, 5	40	Up to 600	4	MIMO-OFDM (64-QAM)	70 m (230 ft)	250 m (820 ft)
1–7 GHz	VHT-OFDM	802.11ac (Wi-Fi 5)	December 2013	5	20	Up to 693	8	DL; MU-MIMO OFDM (256-QAM)	35 m (115 ft)	?
1–7 GHz	VHT-OFDM	802.11ac (Wi-Fi 5)	December 2013	5	40	Up to 1,600	8	DL; MU-MIMO OFDM (256-QAM)	35 m (115 ft)	?
1–7 GHz	VHT-OFDM	802.11ac (Wi-Fi 5)	December 2013	5	80	Up to 3,467	8	DL; MU-MIMO OFDM (256-QAM)	35 m (115 ft)	?
1–7 GHz	VHT-OFDM	802.11ac (Wi-Fi 5)	December 2013	5	160	Up to 6,933	8	DL; MU-MIMO OFDM (256-QAM)	35 m (115 ft)	?
1–7 GHz	HE-OFDMA	802.11ax (Wi-Fi 6, Wi-Fi 6E)	May 2021	2.4, 5, 6	20	Up to 1,147 (Note: For single-user cases only, based on default guard interval which is 0.8 microseconds. Since multi-user via OFDMA has become available for 802.11ax, these may decrease. Also, these theoretical values depend on the link distance, whether the link is line-of-sight or not, interferences and the multi-path components in the environment.)	8	UL/DL; MU-MIMO OFDMA (1024-QAM)	30 m (98 ft)	120 m (390 ft) (Note: The default guard interval is 0.8 microseconds. However, 802.11ax extended the maximum available guard interval to 3.2 microseconds, in order to support outdoor communications, where the maximum possible propagation delay is larger compared to Indoor environments.)
1–7 GHz	HE-OFDMA	802.11ax (Wi-Fi 6, Wi-Fi 6E)	May 2021	2.4, 5, 6	40	Up to 2,294	8	UL/DL; MU-MIMO OFDMA (1024-QAM)	30 m (98 ft)	120 m (390 ft)
1–7 GHz	HE-OFDMA	802.11ax (Wi-Fi 6, Wi-Fi 6E)	May 2021	2.4, 5, 6	80	Up to 5,500	8	UL/DL; MU-MIMO OFDMA (1024-QAM)	30 m (98 ft)	120 m (390 ft)
1–7 GHz	HE-OFDMA	802.11ax (Wi-Fi 6, Wi-Fi 6E)	May 2021	2.4, 5, 6	80+80	Up to 11,000	8	UL/DL; MU-MIMO OFDMA (1024-QAM)	30 m (98 ft)	120 m (390 ft)
1–7 GHz	EHT-OFDMA	802.11be (Wi-Fi 7)	Sep 2024	2.4, 5, 6	80	Up to 5,764	8	UL/DL; MU-MIMO OFDMA (4096-QAM)	30 m (98 ft)	120 m (390 ft)
1–7 GHz	EHT-OFDMA	802.11be (Wi-Fi 7)	Sep 2024	2.4, 5, 6	160 (80+80)	Up to 11,500	8	UL/DL; MU-MIMO OFDMA (4096-QAM)	30 m (98 ft)	120 m (390 ft)
1–7 GHz	EHT-OFDMA	802.11be (Wi-Fi 7)	Sep 2024	2.4, 5, 6	240 (160+80)	Up to 14,282	8	UL/DL; MU-MIMO OFDMA (4096-QAM)	30 m (98 ft)	120 m (390 ft)
1–7 GHz	EHT-OFDMA	802.11be (Wi-Fi 7)	Sep 2024	2.4, 5, 6	320 (160+160)	Up to 23,059	8	UL/DL; MU-MIMO OFDMA (4096-QAM)	30 m (98 ft)	120 m (390 ft)
1–7 GHz	UHR	802.11bn (Wi-Fi 8)	May 2028 (est.)	2.4, 5, 6	320	Up to 23,059	8	Multi-link; MU-MIMO OFDM (4096-QAM)	?	?
1–7 GHz	WUR (Note: Wake-up Radio (WUR) Operation.)	802.11ba	October 2021	2.4, 5	4, 20	0.0625, 0.25 (62.5 kbit/s, 250 kbit/s)	—N/a	OOK (multi-carrier OOK)	?	?
mmWave (WiGig)	DMG	802.11ad	December 2012	60	2,160 (2.16 GHz)	Up to 8,085 (8 Gbit/s)	—N/a	~~OFDM~~, single carrier, low-power single carrier	3.3 m (11 ft)	?
mmWave (WiGig)	DMG	802.11aj	April 2018	60 (Note: For Chinese regulation.)	1,080	Up to 3,754 (3.75 Gbit/s)	—N/a	single carrier, low-power single carrier	?	?
mmWave (WiGig)	CMMG	802.11aj	April 2018	45	540, 1,080	Up to 15,015 (15 Gbit/s)	4	OFDM, single carrier	?	?
mmWave (WiGig)	EDMG	802.11ay	July 2021	60	Up to 8,640 (8.64 GHz)	Up to 303,336 (303 Gbit/s)	8	OFDM, single carrier	10 m (33 ft)	100 m (328 ft)
Sub 1 GHz (IoT)	TVHT	802.11af	February 2014	0.054– 0.79	6, 7, 8	Up to 568.9	4	MIMO-OFDM	?	?
Sub 1 GHz (IoT)	S1G	802.11ah	May 2017	0.7, 0.8, 0.9	1–16	Up to 8.67 (@2 MHz)	4	MIMO-OFDM	?	?
Light (Li-Fi)	LC (VLC/OWC)	802.11bb	November 2023	800–1000 nm	20	Up to 9.6 Gbit/s	—N/a	O-OFDM	?	?
Light (Li-Fi)	~~IR~~ (IrDA)	802.11-1997	June 1997	850–900 nm	?	1, 2	—N/a	~~PPM~~	?	?
802.11 Standard rollups
		802.11-2007 (802.11ma)	March 2007	2.4, 5		Up to 54		DSSS, OFDM		
		802.11-2012 (802.11mb)	March 2012	2.4, 5		Up to 150		DSSS, OFDM		
		802.11-2016 (802.11mc)	December 2016	2.4, 5, 60		Up to 866.7 or 6,757		DSSS, OFDM		
		802.11-2020 (802.11md)	December 2020	2.4, 5, 60		Up to 866.7 or 6,757		DSSS, OFDM		
		802.11-2024 (802.11me)	September 2024	2.4, 5, 6, 60		Up to 9,608 or 303,336		DSSS, OFDM		

== See also ==
- IEEE 802.11
- IEEE 802.11g-2003
- Wi-Fi
- List of WLAN channels
