= Clear channel assessment attack =

Denial of service attack against a Wi-Fi network

A clear channel assessment attack or Queensland attack is a physical layer DoS attack against Wi-Fi networks. The attack focuses the need of a wireless network to receive the "clear channel assessment"; which is a function within CSMA/CA to determine whether the wireless medium is ready and able to receive data, so that the transmitter may start sending it. The attack makes it appear that the airwaves are busy, which basically puts the entire system on hold.

The attack works only on 802.11b, and is not effective on the OFDM-based protocols 802.11g and 802.11a. However, some hybrid 802.11b/g access points will hinder the 802.11g network when the 802.11b network is attacked.

== Discovery ==
The attack was originally discovered by researchers at Queensland University of Technology's Information Security Research Center, thus it is where the name Queensland attack comes from.

== In practice ==
The signal telling the system the airwaves are busy is of course sent through the attacker's NIC, by placing it in continuous transmit mode. The attack can be set up through the use of the Intersil's Prism Test Utility (PrismTestUtil322.exe).
