= Wi-Fi 8 =

Wireless networking standard in development

IEEE 802.11bn, dubbed Ultra High Reliability (UHR), is an upcoming IEEE 802.11 wireless networking standard. It is also designated Wi-Fi 8 by the Wi-Fi Alliance. As its designation suggests, 802.11bn aims to improve the reliability of wireless communications rather than primarily increasing data rates. The standard is projected to be finalized in May 2028.

Wi-Fi and IEEE 802.11 generations
| Genera- tion | IEEE standard | Adopt- ed | Link rate (Mbit/s) | Frequency (GHz) | | |
| Genera- tion | IEEE standard | Adopt- ed | Link rate (Mbit/s) | 2.4 | 5 | 6 |
|---|---|---|---|---|---|---|
| — | 802.11 | 1997 | 1–2 | Yes | | |
| — | 802.11b | 1999 | 1–11 | Yes | | |
| — | 802.11a | 1999 | 6–54 | | Yes | |
| — | 802.11g | 2003 | 6–54 | Yes | | |
| Wi-Fi 4 | 802.11n | 2009 | 6.5–600 | Yes | Yes | |
| Wi-Fi 5 | 802.11ac | 2013 | 6.5–6,933 | (Note: 802.11ac only specifies operation in the 5 GHz band. Operation in the 2.4 GHz band is specified by 802.11n.) | Yes | |
| Wi-Fi 6 | 802.11ax | 2021 | 0.4–9,608 | Yes | Yes | |
| Wi-Fi 6E | 802.11ax | 2021 | 0.4–9,608 | Yes | Yes | Yes |
| Wi-Fi 7 | 802.11be | 2024 | 0.4–23,059 | Yes | Yes | Yes |
| Wi-Fi 8 | 802.11bn | TBA | 0.4–23,059 | Yes | Yes | Yes |

== Background ==
The IEEE 802.11bn Ultra High Reliability study group was established in 2021 to address the need for more reliable wireless communications in increasingly dense and interference-prone environments. Unlike previous Wi-Fi generations that focused primarily on increasing peak data rates, Wi-Fi 8 represents a shift toward improving effective throughput and reducing latency in real-world conditions.

The development recognizes that while theoretical peak throughput of modern Wi-Fi often exceeds application requirements, users frequently experience intermittent connectivity issues due to environmental factors, interference, and protocol overhead in dense deployment scenarios.

== Technical specifications ==
802.11bn maintains the same frequency bands as Wi-Fi 7: 2.4 GHz, 5 GHz, and 6 GHz. The maximum channel bandwidth remains at 320 MHz, and it continues to support 4096-QAM modulation and up to 8 spatial streams. The theoretical maximum data rate is expected to remain at approximately 23 Gbps, the same as Wi-Fi 7.

=== Wi-Fi 8 requirements ===
The 802.11bn standard (Wi-Fi 8) defines ultra-high reliability capability for both isolated basic service sets (BSSs) and overlapping BSSs. Specifically, compared to Wi-Fi 7, Wi-Fi 8 targets to:

- increase throughput by 25% at a given signal-to-interference-and-noise ratio compared to Wi-Fi 7
- reduce latency by 25% for the 95th percentile of the latency distribution
- decrease MAC protocol data unit (MPDU) loss by 25%, especially for transitions between BSSs

Additionally, the 802.11bn standard aims to enhance power save for access points (including mobile ones) and improve peer-to-peer operation.

== Rate Sets ==
UHR-MCS parameters for full-bandwidth RUs (N_{SS} = 1, 0.8 µs GI)
| UHR-MCS index | Modulation | Coding rate (R) | 20 MHz (Mbit/s) | 40 MHz (Mbit/s) | 80 MHz (Mbit/s) | 160 MHz (Mbit/s) | 320 MHz (Mbit/s) |
|---|---|---|---|---|---|---|---|
| 0 | BPSK | 1/2 | 8.6 | 17.2 | 36.0 | 72.1 | 144.1 |
| 1 | QPSK | 1/2 | 17.2 | 34.4 | 72.1 | 144.1 | 288.2 |
| 2 | QPSK | 3/4 | 25.8 | 51.6 | 108.1 | 216.2 | 432.4 |
| 3 | 16-QAM | 1/2 | 34.4 | 68.8 | 144.1 | 288.2 | 576.5 |
| 4 | 16-QAM | 3/4 | 51.6 | 103.2 | 216.2 | 432.4 | 864.7 |
| 5 | 64-QAM | 2/3 | 68.8 | 137.6 | 288.2 | 576.5 | 1152.9 |
| 6 | 64-QAM | 3/4 | 77.4 | 154.9 | 324.3 | 648.5 | 1297.1 |
| 7 | 64-QAM | 5/6 | 86.0 | 172.1 | 360.3 | 720.6 | 1441.2 |
| 8 | 256-QAM | 3/4 | 103.2 | 206.5 | 432.4 | 864.7 | 1729.4 |
| 9 | 256-QAM | 5/6 | 114.7 | 229.4 | 480.4 | 960.7 | 1921.5 |
| 10 | 1024-QAM | 3/4 | 129.0 | 258.1 | 540.4 | 1080.9 | 2161.8 |
| 11 | 1024-QAM | 5/6 | 143.4 | 286.8 | 600.4 | 1201.0 | 2401.9 |
| 12 | 4096-QAM | 3/4 | 154.9 | 309.7 | 648.5 | 1297.1 | 2594.1 |
| 13 | 4096-QAM | 5/6 | 172.1 | 344.1 | 720.6 | 1441.2 | 2882.4 |
| 15 | BPSK-DCM | 1/2 | 4.3 | 8.6 | 18.0 | 36.0 | 72.1 |
| 17 | QPSK | 2/3 | 22.9 | 45.9 | 96.0 | 192.1 | 384.3 |
| 19 | 16-QAM | 2/3 | 45.9 | 91.8 | 192.1 | 384.3 | 768.6 |
| 20 | 16-QAM | 5/6 | 57.4 | 114.7 | 240.1 | 480.4 | 960.7 |
| 23 | 256-QAM | 2/3 | 91.8 | 183.5 | 384.3 | 768.6 | 1537.2 |

== Key features ==
=== Multi-AP coordination ===
Wi-Fi 8 introduces enhanced coordination between multiple access points (i.e., BSSs). Many Multi-AP schemes have been discussed during the development of 802.11be but were postponed due to specification complexity, so 802.11bn continues this direction. In short, Multi-AP leverages the classical Wi-Fi mechanisms, e.g., Restricted Target Wake Time, Spatial Reuse, Beamforming, and others, by strengthening them thanks to enabling their cooperative work across multiple BSSs. Correspondingly, 802.11bn introduces multiple schemes, each varying with targets, efficiency, complexity, and overhead:

- Coordinated R-TWT (Co-RTWT)
- Coordinated Spatial Reuse (Co-SR)
- Coordinated Beamforming (Co-BF)
- Coordinated Time Division Multiple Access (Co-TDMA)
- Coordinated Channel Recommendation (Co-CR)

These Multi-AP schemes allow access points to manage interference more effectively while sharing spectrum resources, enabling simultaneous transmissions that would otherwise conflict.

=== Seamless Roaming ===
Wi-Fi 8 offers Seamless Mobility Domain (SMD) to address high latency and low reliability cases that are often experienced when devices move between Wi-Fi networks. SMD defines a single entity covering multiple AP MLDs, which may not be colocated within a physical device. Within an SMD, the context, i.e., the states of handshakes, sequence numbers, security keys, and capabilities, can be transferred between multiple AP MLDs, i.e., among Wi-Fi networks. Such coordination reduces the unavailability time and decreases the loss ratio when a client MLD device roams from one Wi-Fi network to another. An SMD also enables a step-by-step per-link transition of the client MLD between AP MLDs, which promises to enable seamless connectivity.

=== Enhanced spectrum utilization ===
Dynamic Sub-channel Operation (DSO) and Non-Primary Channel Access (NPCA) optimize spectrum allocation to improve performance when devices have disparate channel bandwidth capabilities. These features address scenarios where high-bandwidth access points must reduce their transmission capability to accommodate lower-bandwidth clients.

=== Extended range capabilities ===
The Enhanced Long Range (ELR) protocol data unit format is designed to overcome link budget imbalances between uplink and downlink transmissions, improving spectrum efficiency for stations operating at greater distances from access points. ELR operates at 20 MHz bandwidth with support for BPSK and QPSK modulation.

=== Distributed-tone resource units ===
Distributed-tone Resource Units (DRUs) use a separate OFDM tone plan with distributed OFDM subcarriers. Specifically, while a regular resource unit spans a continuous subset of subcarriers, each DRU spreads its tones across the entire available distribution bandwidth. This feature helps to overcome regulatory power spectral density limitations, which are defined in terms of narrow bandwidth pieces, thus achieving higher transmission power across a wider bandwidth for multiple stations in uplink transmissions. This feature supports distribution bandwidths of 20 MHz, 40 MHz, and 80 MHz.

=== Additional MCS values ===
Wi-Fi 8 introduces four new Modulation and Coding Scheme values to provide finer granulation between existing MCS levels, improving link adaptation accuracy and transmission rates by 5–30% depending on channel conditions.

=== Quality of service enhancements ===
High Priority Enhanced Distributed Channel Access (HIP EDCA) and TXOP Preemption mechanisms are designed to reduce long-tail latency for time-sensitive applications such as gaming, video conferencing, and real-time communications.

=== In-Device Coexistence ===
In-Device Coexistence (IDC) mechanisms improve coordination between Wi-Fi and other wireless technologies such as Bluetooth, Zigbee, and Ultra-wideband within the same device, reducing interference and improving overall performance.

=== AI Offload ===
In March 2026, IEEE 802.11 approved the formation of an AI Offload Study Group, tasked with developing a Project Authorization Request for a future amendment that would allow Wi-Fi access points and other Wi-Fi-enabled edge devices to accept and execute compute-intensive AI inference workloads on behalf of nearby devices, such as AI-enabled smart glasses and robotic systems requiring low-latency access to compute resources. This work is separate from, but running in parallel to, the 802.11bn amendment itself, and reflects early discussions toward a subsequent generation sometimes referred to as Wi-Fi 9.

== Development timeline ==
The 802.11bn Task Group was formed in May 2021. Development milestones include:

- November 2023: Task group work formally begins
- July 2025: Draft 1.0 completed, defining the technical scope
- Letter Ballot 291 on Draft 1.0 generated more than 8,000 comments
- January 2026: Draft 1.3 approved after resolving approximately 740 comments at the Victoria interim session
- March 2026: Draft 1.4 authorized, with roughly 60% of comments resolved
- May 2026: Approximately 75% of comments resolved at the Antwerp interim session; Draft 2.0, originally targeted for May 2026, slipped to a planned ballot in July 2026
- Target ratification: May 2028, though the task group's own reporting has also cited a target as late as September 2028

Wi-Fi 8 certification by the Wi-Fi Alliance is expected to begin around mid-2027, with commercial chipsets and pre-standard products becoming available before final ratification, following the pattern established by previous Wi-Fi generations.

== Applications ==
Wi-Fi 8's reliability improvements are particularly targeted at applications requiring consistent low-latency connectivity:

- Extended reality (XR) applications including VR and AR
- Industrial automation and IoT deployments
- High-density public venues and enterprise networks
- Real-time gaming and interactive media
- Telemedicine and remote healthcare applications

== Industry adoption ==
Major networking equipment manufacturers and chipset vendors are actively participating in the 802.11bn development process. Companies including MediaTek, Qualcomm, Intel, and Broadcom are contributing to the specification and developing early implementations.

The wireless industry anticipates Wi-Fi 8 will be particularly valuable in environments where reliability is more critical than peak performance, complementing rather than replacing 5G cellular networks for internet access.

== See also ==
- IEEE 802.11
- IEEE 802.11be (Wi-Fi 7)
- Wi-Fi Alliance
- List of WLAN channels
