= Direct-sequence spread spectrum =

Modulation technique to reduce signal interference

In telecommunications, direct-sequence spread spectrum (DSSS) is a spread-spectrum modulation technique primarily used to reduce overall signal interference. The direct-sequence modulation makes the transmitted signal wider in bandwidth than the information bandwidth. After the despreading or removal of the direct-sequence modulation in the receiver, the information bandwidth is restored, while the unintentional and intentional interference is substantially reduced.

Swiss inventor Gustav Guanella proposed a "means for and method of secret signals". With DSSS, the message symbols are modulated by a sequence of complex values known as spreading sequence. Each element of the spreading sequence, a so-called chip, has a shorter duration than the original message symbols. The modulation of the message symbols scrambles and spreads the signal in the spectrum, and thereby results in a bandwidth of the spreading sequence. The smaller the chip duration, the larger the bandwidth of the resulting DSSS signal; more bandwidth multiplexed to the message signal results in better resistance against narrowband interference.

Some practical and effective uses of DSSS include the code-division multiple access (CDMA) method, the IEEE 802.11b specification used in Wi-Fi networks, and the Global Positioning System.

== Transmission method ==
Direct-sequence spread-spectrum transmissions multiply the symbol sequence being transmitted with a spreading sequence that has a higher rate than the original message rate. Usually, sequences are chosen such that the resulting spectrum is spectrally white. Knowledge of the same sequence is used to reconstruct the original data at the receiving end. This is commonly implemented by the element-wise multiplication with the spreading sequence, followed by summation over a message symbol period. This process, despreading, is mathematically a correlation of the transmitted spreading sequence with the spreading sequence. In an additive white gaussian noise channel, the despreaded signal's signal-to-noise ratio is increased by the spreading factor, which is the ratio of the spreading-sequence rate to the data rate.

While a transmitted DSSS signal occupies a wider bandwidth than the direct modulation of the original signal would require, its spectrum can be restricted by conventional pulse-shape filtering.

If an undesired transmitter transmits on the same channel but with a different spreading sequence, the despreading process reduces the power of that signal. This effect is the basis for the code-division multiple access (CDMA) method of multi-user medium access, which allows multiple transmitters to share the same channel within the limits of the cross-correlation properties of their spreading sequences.

== Benefits ==
- Resistance to unintended or intended jamming
- Sharing of a single channel among multiple users
- Reduced signal/background-noise level hampers interception
- Determination of relative timing between transmitter and receiver

== Uses ==
- The United States GPS, European Galileo and Russian GLONASS satellite navigation systems; earlier GLONASS used DSSS with a single spreading sequence in conjunction with FDMA, while later GLONASS used DSSS to achieve CDMA with multiple spreading sequences.
- DS-CDMA (Direct-Sequence Code Division Multiple Access) is a multiple access scheme based on DSSS, by spreading the signals from/to different users with different codes. It is the most widely used type of CDMA.
- Cordless phones operating in the 900 MHz, 2.4 GHz and 5.8 GHz bands
- IEEE 802.11b 2.4 GHz Wi-Fi, and its predecessor 802.11-1999. (Their successor 802.11g uses both OFDM and DSSS)
- Automatic meter reading
- IEEE 802.15.4 (used, e.g., as PHY and MAC layer for Zigbee, or, as the physical layer for WirelessHART)
- Radio-controlled model Automotive, Aeronautical and Marine vehicles
- Spread spectrum radar for covertness and resistance to jamming and spoofing

== See also ==
- Complementary code keying
- Frequency-hopping spread spectrum
- Linear-feedback shift register
- Orthogonal frequency-division multiplexing
