= MIMO-OFDM =

Air interface for 4G and 5G broadband wireless communications

Multiple-input, multiple-output orthogonal frequency-division multiplexing (MIMO-OFDM) is the dominant air interface for 4G and 5G broadband wireless communications. It combines multiple-input, multiple-output (MIMO) technology, which multiplies capacity by transmitting different signals over multiple antennas, and orthogonal frequency-division multiplexing (OFDM), which divides a radio channel into a large number of closely spaced subchannels to provide more reliable communications at high speeds. Research conducted during the mid-1990s showed that while MIMO can be used with other popular air interfaces such as time-division multiple access (TDMA) and code-division multiple access (CDMA), the combination of MIMO and OFDM is most practical at higher data rates.

MIMO-OFDM is the foundation for most advanced wireless local area network (wireless LAN) and mobile broadband network standards because it achieves the greatest spectral efficiency and, therefore, delivers the highest capacity and data throughput. Greg Raleigh invented MIMO in 1996 when he showed that different data streams could be transmitted at the same time on the same frequency by taking advantage of the fact that signals transmitted through space bounce off objects (such as the ground) and take multiple paths to the receiver. That is, by using multiple antennas and precoding the data, different data streams could be sent over different paths. Raleigh suggested and later proved that the processing required by MIMO at higher speeds would be most manageable using OFDM modulation, because OFDM converts a high-speed data channel into a number of parallel lower-speed channels.

== Operation ==
In modern usage, the term "MIMO" indicates more than just the presence of multiple transmit antennas (multiple input) and multiple receive antennas (multiple output). While multiple transmit antennas can be used for beamforming, and multiple receive antennas can be used for diversity, the word "MIMO" refers to the simultaneous transmission of multiple signals (spatial multiplexing) to multiply spectral efficiency (capacity).

Traditionally, radio engineers treated natural multipath propagation as an impairment to be mitigated. MIMO is the first radio technology that treats multipath propagation as a phenomenon to be exploited. MIMO multiplies the capacity of a radio link by transmitting multiple signals over multiple, co-located antennas. This is accomplished without the need for additional power or bandwidth. Space–time codes are employed to ensure that the signals transmitted over the different antennas are orthogonal to each other, making it easier for the receiver to distinguish one from another. Even when there is line of sight access between two stations, dual antenna polarization may be used to ensure that there is more than one robust path.

OFDM enables reliable broadband communications by distributing user data across a number of closely spaced, narrowband subchannels. This arrangement makes it possible to eliminate the biggest obstacle to reliable broadband communications, intersymbol interference (ISI). ISI occurs when the overlap between consecutive symbols is large compared to the symbols' duration. Normally, high data rates require shorter duration symbols, increasing the risk of ISI. By dividing a high-rate data stream into numerous low-rate data streams, OFDM enables longer duration symbols. A cyclic prefix (CP) may be inserted to create a (time) guard interval that prevents ISI entirely. If the guard interval is longer than the delay spread—the difference in delays experienced by symbols transmitted over the channel—then there will be no overlap between adjacent symbols and consequently no intersymbol interference. Though the CP slightly reduces spectral capacity by consuming a small percentage of the available bandwidth, the elimination of ISI makes it an exceedingly worthwhile tradeoff.

A key advantage of OFDM is that fast Fourier transforms (FFTs) may be used to simplify implementation. Fourier transforms convert signals back and forth between the time domain and frequency domain. Consequently, Fourier transforms can exploit the fact that any complex waveform may be decomposed into a series of simple sinusoids. In signal processing applications, discrete Fourier transforms (DFTs) are used to operate on real-time signal samples. DFTs may be applied to composite OFDM signals, avoiding the need for the banks of oscillators and demodulators associated with individual subcarriers. Fast Fourier transforms are numerical algorithms used by computers to perform DFT calculations.

FFTs also enable OFDM to make efficient use of bandwidth. The subchannels must be spaced apart in frequency just enough to ensure that their time-domain waveforms are orthogonal to each other. In practice, this means that the subchannels are allowed to partially overlap in frequency.

MIMO-OFDM is a particularly powerful combination because MIMO does not attempt to mitigate multipath propagation and OFDM avoids the need for signal equalization. MIMO-OFDM can achieve very high spectral efficiency even when the transmitter does not possess channel state information (CSI). When the transmitter does possess CSI (which can be obtained through the use of training sequences), it is possible to approach the theoretical channel capacity. CSI may be used, for example, to allocate different size signal constellations to the individual subcarriers, making optimal use of the communications channel at any given moment of time.

More recent MIMO-OFDM developments include multi-user MIMO (MU-MIMO), higher order MIMO implementations (greater number of spatial streams), and research concerning massive MIMO and cooperative MIMO (CO-MIMO) for inclusion in coming 5G standards.

MU-MIMO is part of the IEEE 802.11ac standard, the first Wi-Fi standard to offer speeds in the gigabit per second range. MU-MIMO enables an access point (AP) to transmit to up to four client devices simultaneously. This eliminates contention delays, but requires frequent channel measurements to properly direct the signals. Each user may employ up to four of the available eight spatial streams. For example, an AP with eight antennas can talk to two client devices with four antennas, providing four spatial streams to each. Alternatively, the same AP can talk to four client devices with two antennas each, providing two spatial streams to each.

Multi-user MIMO beamforming even benefits single spatial stream devices. Prior to MU-MIMO beamforming, an access point communicating with multiple client devices could only transmit to one at a time. With MU-MIMO beamforming, the access point can transmit to up to four single stream devices at the same time on the same channel.

The 802.11ac standard also supports speeds up to 6.93 Gbit/s using eight spatial streams in single-user mode. The maximum data rate assumes use of the optional 160 MHz channel in the 5 GHz band and 256 QAM (quadrature amplitude modulation). Chipsets supporting six spatial streams have been introduced and chipsets supporting eight spatial streams are under development.

Massive MIMO consists of a large number of base station antennas operating in a MU-MIMO environment. While LTE networks already support handsets using two spatial streams, and handset antenna designs capable of supporting four spatial streams have been tested, massive MIMO can deliver significant capacity gains even to single spatial stream handsets. Again, MU-MIMO beamforming is used to enable the base station to transmit independent data streams to multiple handsets on the same channel at the same time. However, one question still to be answered by research is: When is it best to add antennas to the base station and when is it best to add small cells?

Another focus of research for 5G wireless is CO-MIMO. In CO-MIMO, clusters of base stations work together to boost performance. This can be done using macro diversity for improved reception of signals from handsets or multi-cell multiplexing to achieve higher downlink data rates. However, CO-MIMO requires high-speed communication between the cooperating base stations.

== History ==
Gregory Raleigh was first to advocate the use of MIMO in combination with OFDM. In a theoretical paper, he proved that with the proper type of MIMO system—multiple, co-located antennas transmitting and receiving multiple information streams using multidimensional coding and encoding—multipath propagation could be exploited to multiply the capacity of a wireless link. Up to that time, radio engineers tried to make real-world channels behave like ideal channels by mitigating the effects of multipath propagation. However, mitigation strategies have never been fully successful. In order to exploit multipath propagation, it was necessary to identify modulation and coding techniques that perform robustly over time-varying, dispersive, multipath channels. Raleigh published additional research on MIMO-OFDM under time-varying conditions, MIMO-OFDM channel estimation, MIMO-OFDM synchronization techniques, and the performance of the first experimental MIMO-OFDM system.

Raleigh solidified the case for OFDM by analyzing the performance of MIMO with three leading modulation techniques in his PhD dissertation: quadrature amplitude modulation (QAM), direct sequence spread spectrum (DSSS), and discrete multi-tone (DMT). QAM is representative of narrowband schemes such as TDMA that use equalization to combat ISI. DSSS uses rake receivers to compensate for multipath and is used by CDMA systems. DMT uses interleaving and coding to eliminate ISI and is representative of OFDM systems. The analysis was performed by deriving the MIMO channel matrix models for the three modulation schemes, quantifying the computational complexity and assessing the channel estimation and synchronization challenges for each. The models showed that for a MIMO system using QAM with an equalizer or DSSS with a rake receiver, computational complexity grows quadratically as data rate is increased. In contrast, when MIMO is used with DMT, computational complexity grows log-linearly (i.e., n log n) as data rate is increased.

Raleigh subsequently founded Clarity Wireless in 1996 and Airgo Networks in 2001 to commercialize the technology. Clarity developed specifications in the Broadband Wireless Internet Forum (BWIF) that led to the IEEE 802.16 (commercialized as WiMAX) and LTE standards, both of which support MIMO. Airgo designed and shipped the first MIMO-OFDM chipsets for what became the IEEE 802.11n standard. MIMO-OFDM is also used in the 802.11ac standard and is expected to play a major role in 802.11ax and fifth generation (5G) mobile phone systems.

Several early papers on multi-user MIMO were authored by Ross Murch et al. at Hong Kong University of Science and Technology. MU-MIMO was included in the 802.11ac standard (developed starting in 2011 and approved in 2014). MU-MIMO capacity appears for the first time in what have become known as "Wave 2" products. Qualcomm announced chipsets supporting MU-MIMO in April 2014.

Broadcom introduced the first 802.11ac chipsets supporting six spatial streams for data rates up to 3.2 Gbit/s in April 2014. Quantenna says it is developing chipsets to support eight spatial streams for data rates up to 10 Gbit/s.

Massive MIMO, Cooperative MIMO (CO-MIMO), and HetNets (heterogeneous networks) are currently the focus of research concerning 5G wireless. The development of 5G standards is expected to begin in 2016. Prominent researchers to date include Jakob Hoydis (of Alcatel-Lucent), Robert W. Heath (at the University of Texas at Austin), Helmut Bölcskei (at ETH Zurich), and David Gesbert (at EURECOM).

Trials of 5G technology have been conducted by Samsung. Japanese operator NTT DoCoMo plans to trial 5G technology in collaboration with Alcatel-Lucent, Ericsson, Fujitsu, NEC, Nokia, and Samsung.
