= IEEE 802.11ah =

Wireless networking protocol

IEEE 802.11ah is a wireless networking protocol called Wi-Fi HaLow (/ˈheɪˌloʊ/) published in 2017 as an amendment of the IEEE 802.11-2007 wireless networking standard. It uses 900 MHz or 860 MHz license exempt bands to provide extended range Wi-Fi networks, compared to conventional Wi-Fi networks operating in the 2.4 GHz, 5 GHz and 6 GHz bands. It also benefits from lower energy consumption, allowing the creation of large groups of stations or sensors that cooperate to share signals, supporting the concept of the Internet of things (IoT). The protocol's low power consumption competes with Bluetooth, LoRa, Zigbee, and Z-Wave, and has the added benefit of higher data rates and wider coverage range.

A benefit of 802.11ah is extended range, making it useful for rural communications and offloading cell phone tower traffic. The other purpose of the protocol is to allow low rate 802.11 wireless stations to be used in the sub-gigahertz spectrum. It aims at providing connectivity to thousands of devices under an access point. The protocol supports machine to machine (M2M) markets, like smart metering.

== Description ==
The protocol is one of the IEEE 802.11 technologies which is the most different from the LAN model, especially concerning medium contention. A prominent aspect of 802.11ah is the behavior of stations that are grouped to minimize contention on the air media, use relay to extend their reach, use little power thanks to predefined wake/doze periods, are still able to send data at high speed under some negotiated conditions and use sectored antennas. It takes the 802.11a/g specification and downsamples it to operate on a minimum of 1 MHz bandwidth. It can cover a one-kilometer radius.

Throughput strongly depends on the regional legal context. In the best case, the United States, this allows for 26 channels in the 902–928 MHz ISM band, (Note: Band for North America. In Europe the band is narrower at 863–868 MHz. See List of WLAN channels § 860/900 MHz (802.11ah) for a full list.) each of them typically able to provide 100 kbit/s throughput. In the worst case, the European Union, only 2 channels are available in the 867-868 Mhz ISM band, greatly limiting its usefulness.

=== Data rates ===
Data rates up to 433.3 Mbit/s are achieved only with the maximum of four spatial streams using one 16 MHz-wide channel. Various modulation schemes and coding rates are defined by the standard and are represented by a Modulation and Coding Scheme (MCS) index value. The table below shows the relationships between the variables that allow for the maximum data rate. The Guard interval (GI) is defined as the timing between symbols.

All channels sizes are based on OFDM implemented via FFT. The typical 2 MHz channel uses an FFT of 64 points, for a carrier separation of 31.25 kHz (2 MHz/64) (32 μs). 56 of these are actually used subcarriers, so the total bandwidth is 2 MHz with an occupied bandwidth of 1.78 MHz. Out of these 56 subcarriers, 52 are for data and 4 for pilot tones. Each of these subcarriers can be a BPSK, QPSK, 16-QAM, 64-QAM, 256-QAM, or 1024-QAM. Total symbol duration is 36 or 40 microseconds, which includes a guard interval of 4 or 8 microseconds.

Modulation and coding schemes
MCS index (Note: MCS 9 is not applicable to all channel width/spatial stream combinations.)	Spatial Streams	Modulation type	Coding rate	Data rate (Mbit/s)									
MCS index	Spatial Streams	Modulation type	Coding rate	1 MHz channels		2 MHz channels		4 MHz channels		8 MHz channels		16 MHz channels	
MCS index	Spatial Streams	Modulation type	Coding rate	8 μs GI (Note: GI stands for the guard interval.)	4 μs GI	8 μs GI	4 μs GI	8 μs GI	4 μs GI	8 μs GI	4 μs GI	8 μs GI	4 μs GI
0	1	BPSK	1/2	0.3	0.33	0.65	0.72	1.35	1.5	2.93	3.25	5.85	6.5
1	1	QPSK	1/2	0.6	0.67	1.3	1.44	2.7	3.0	5.85	6.5	11.7	13.0
2	1	QPSK	3/4	0.9	1.0	1.95	2.17	4.05	4.5	8.78	9.75	17.6	19.5
3	1	16-QAM	1/2	1.2	1.33	2.6	2.89	5.4	6.0	11.7	13.0	23.4	26.0
4	1	16-QAM	3/4	1.8	2.0	3.9	4.33	8.1	9.0	17.6	19.5	35.1	39.0
5	1	64-QAM	2/3	2.4	2.67	5.2	5.78	10.8	12.0	23.4	26.0	46.8	52.0
6	1	64-QAM	3/4	2.7	3.0	5.85	6.5	12.2	13.5	26.3	29.3	52.7	58.5
7	1	64-QAM	5/6	3.0	3.34	6.5	7.22	13.5	15.0	29.3	32.5	58.5	65.0
8	1	256-QAM	3/4	3.6	4.0	7.8	8.67	16.2	18.0	35.1	39.0	70.2	78.0
9	1	256-QAM	5/6	4.0	4.44	—N/a	—N/a	18.0	20.0	39.0	43.3	78.0	86.7
10	1	BPSK	1/2 x 2	0.15	0.17	—N/a	—N/a	—N/a	—N/a	—N/a	—N/a	—N/a	—N/a
11	1	1024-QAM	3/4	4.5	5.0	9.75	10.83	20.25	22.5	43.87	48.75	87.75	97.5
12	1	1024-QAM	5/6	5.0	5.55	—N/a	—N/a	22.5	25.0	48.75	54.17	97.50	108.33
0	2	BPSK	1/2	0.6	0.67	1.3	1.44	2.7	3.0	5.85	6.5	11.7	13.0
1	2	QPSK	1/2	1.2	1.34	2.6	2.89	5.4	6.0	11.7	13.0	23.4	26.0
2	2	QPSK	3/4	1.8	2.0	3.9	4.33	8.1	9.0	17.6	19.5	35.1	39.0
3	2	16-QAM	1/2	2.4	2.67	5.2	5.78	10.8	12.0	23.4	26.0	46.8	52.0
4	2	16-QAM	3/4	3.6	4.0	7.8	8.67	16.2	18.0	35.1	39.0	70.2	78.0
5	2	64-QAM	2/3	4.8	5.34	10.4	11.6	21.6	24.0	46.8	52.0	93.6	104
6	2	64-QAM	3/4	5.4	6.0	11.7	13.0	24.3	27.0	52.7	58.5	105	117
7	2	64-QAM	5/6	6.0	6.67	13.0	14.4	27.0	30.0	58.5	65.0	117	130
8	2	256-QAM	3/4	7.2	8.0	15.6	17.3	32.4	36.0	70.2	78.0	140	156
9	2	256-QAM	5/6	8.0	8.89	—N/a	—N/a	36.0	40.0	78.0	86.7	156	173
11	2	1024-QAM	3/4	9.0	10.0	19.50	21.67	40.50	45.0	87.75	97.50	175.50	195.0
12	2	1024-QAM	5/6	10.0	11.11	—N/a	—N/a	45.0	50.0	97.5	108.33	195.0	216.67
0	3	BPSK	1/2	0.9	1.0	1.95	2.17	4.05	4.5	8.78	9.75	17.6	19.5
1	3	QPSK	1/2	1.8	2.0	3.9	4.33	8.1	9.0	17.6	19.5	35.1	39.0
2	3	QPSK	3/4	2.7	3.0	5.85	6.5	12.2	13.5	26.3	29.3	52.7	58.5
3	3	16-QAM	1/2	3.6	4.0	7.8	8.67	16.2	18.0	35.1	39.0	70.2	78.0
4	3	16-QAM	3/4	5.4	6.0	11.7	13.0	24.3	27.0	52.7	58.5	105	117
5	3	64-QAM	2/3	7.2	8.0	15.6	17.3	32.4	36.0	70.2	78.0	140	156
6	3	64-QAM	3/4	8.1	9.0	17.6	19.5	36.5	40.5	78.96	87.75	158	176
7	3	64-QAM	5/6	9.0	10.0	19.5	21.7	40.5	45.0	87.8	97.5	176	195
8	3	256-QAM	3/4	10.8	12.0	23.4	26.0	48.6	54.0	105	117	211	234
9	3	256-QAM	5/6	12.0	13.34	26.0	28.9	54.0	60.0	117	130	234.0	260.0
11	3	1024-QAM	3/4	13.5	15.0	29.25	32.5	60.75	67.5	131.63	146.25	263.25	292.5
12	3	1024-QAM	5/6	15.0	16.67	32.5	36.11	67.5	75.0	146.25	162.5	292.5	325.0

=== MAC features ===
==== Relay Access Point ====
A Relay Access Point (AP) is an entity that logically consists of a Relay and a networking station (STA), or client. The relay function allows an AP and stations to exchange frames with one another by the way of a relay. The introduction of a relay allows stations to use higher MCSs (Modulation and Coding Schemes) and reduce the time stations will stay in Active mode. This improves battery life of stations. Relay stations may also provide connectivity for stations located outside the coverage of the AP. There is an overhead cost on overall network efficiency and increased complexity with the use of relay stations. To limit this overhead, the relaying function shall be bi-directional and limited to two hops only.

==== Power saving ====
Power-saving stations are divided into two classes: TIM stations and non-TIM stations. TIM stations periodically receive information about traffic buffered for them from the access point in the so-called TIM information element, hence the name. Non-TIM stations use the new Target Wake Time mechanism which enables reducing signaling overhead.

==== Target Wake Time ====
Target Wake Time (TWT) is a function that permits an AP to define a specific time or set of times for individual stations to access the medium. The STA (client) and the AP exchange information that includes an expected activity duration to allow the AP to control the amount of contention and overlap among competing STAs. The AP can protect the expected duration of activity with various protection mechanisms. The use of TWT is negotiated between an AP and an STA. Target Wake Time may be used to reduce network energy consumption, as stations that use it can enter a doze state until their TWT arrives.

==== Restricted Access Window ====
Restricted Access Window allows partitioning of the stations within a Basic Service Set (BSS) into groups and restricting channel access only to stations belonging to a given group at any given time period. It helps to reduce contention and to avoid simultaneous transmissions from a large number of stations hidden from each other.

==== Bidirectional TXOP ====
Bidirectional TXOP allows an AP and non-AP (STA or client) to exchange a sequence of uplink and downlink frames during a reserved time (transmit opportunity or TXOP). This operation mode is intended to reduce the number of contention-based channel accesses, improve channel efficiency by minimizing the number of frame exchanges required for uplink and downlink data frames, and enable stations to extend battery lifetime by keeping Awake times short. This continuous frame exchange is done both uplink and downlink between the pair of stations. In earlier versions of the standard Bidirectional TXOP was called Speed Frame Exchange.

==== Sectorization ====
The partition of the coverage area of a Basic Service Set (BSS) into sectors, each containing a subset of stations, is called sectorization. This partitioning is achieved through a set of antennas or a set of synthesized antenna beams to cover different sectors of the BSS. The goal of the sectorization is to reduce medium contention or interference by the reduced number of stations within a sector and/or to allow spatial sharing among overlapping BSS (OBSS) APs or stations.

== Comparison with 802.11af ==
Another WLAN standard for sub-1 GHz bands is IEEE 802.11af which, unlike 802.11ah, operates in licensed bands. More specifically, 802.11af operates in the TV white space spectrum in the VHF and UHF bands between 54 and 790 MHz using cognitive radio technology.

== IEEE 802.11 network standards ==
802.11 network standards
Frequency range, or type	PHY	Protocol	Release date	Frequency band	Channel width	Stream data rate	Max. MIMO streams	Modulation	Approx. range	
Frequency range, or type	PHY	Protocol	Release date	Frequency band	Channel width	Stream data rate	Max. MIMO streams	Modulation	Indoor	Outdoor
Frequency range, or type	PHY	Protocol	Release date	(GHz)	(MHz)	(Mbit/s)	Max. MIMO streams	Modulation	Indoor	Outdoor
1–7 GHz	DSSS, ~~FHSS~~ (Note: This is obsolete, and support for this might be subject to removal in a future revision of the standard)	802.11-1997	June 1997	2.4	22	1, 2	—N/a	DSSS, ~~FHSS~~	20 m (66 ft)	100 m (330 ft)
1–7 GHz	HR/DSSS	802.11b	September 1999	2.4	22	1, 2, 5.5, 11	—N/a	CCK, DSSS	35 m (115 ft)	140 m (460 ft)
1–7 GHz	OFDM	802.11a	September 1999	5	5, 10, 20	6, 9, 12, 18, 24, 36, 48, 54 (for 20 MHz bandwidth, divide by 2 and 4 for 10 and 5 MHz)	—N/a	OFDM	35 m (115 ft)	120 m (390 ft)
1–7 GHz	OFDM	802.11j	November 2004	4.9, 5.0 (Note: For Japanese regulation.)	5, 10, 20	6, 9, 12, 18, 24, 36, 48, 54 (for 20 MHz bandwidth, divide by 2 and 4 for 10 and 5 MHz)	—N/a	OFDM	?	?
1–7 GHz	OFDM	802.11y	November 2008	3.7 (Note: IEEE 802.11y-2008 extended operation of 802.11a to the licensed 3.7 GHz band. Increased power limits allow a range up to 5,000 m. As of 2009, it is only being licensed in the United States by the FCC.)	5, 10, 20	6, 9, 12, 18, 24, 36, 48, 54 (for 20 MHz bandwidth, divide by 2 and 4 for 10 and 5 MHz)	—N/a	OFDM	?	5,000 m (16,000 ft)
1–7 GHz	OFDM	802.11p	July 2010	5.9	5, 10, 20	6, 9, 12, 18, 24, 36, 48, 54 (for 20 MHz bandwidth, divide by 2 and 4 for 10 and 5 MHz)	—N/a	OFDM	200 m	1,000 m (3,300 ft)
1–7 GHz	OFDM	802.11bd	December 2022	5.9, 60	5, 10, 20	6, 9, 12, 18, 24, 36, 48, 54 (for 20 MHz bandwidth, divide by 2 and 4 for 10 and 5 MHz)	—N/a	OFDM	500 m	1,000 m (3,300 ft)
1–7 GHz	ERP-OFDM	802.11g	June 2003	2.4	5, 10, 20	6, 9, 12, 18, 24, 36, 48, 54 (for 20 MHz bandwidth, divide by 2 and 4 for 10 and 5 MHz)	—N/a	OFDM	38 m (125 ft)	140 m (460 ft)
1–7 GHz	HT-OFDM	802.11n (Wi-Fi 4)	October 2009	2.4, 5	20	Up to 288.8 (Note: Based on short guard interval; standard guard interval is ~10% slower. Rates vary widely based on distance, obstructions, and interference.)	4	MIMO-OFDM (64-QAM)	70 m (230 ft)	250 m (820 ft)
1–7 GHz	HT-OFDM	802.11n (Wi-Fi 4)	October 2009	2.4, 5	40	Up to 600	4	MIMO-OFDM (64-QAM)	70 m (230 ft)	250 m (820 ft)
1–7 GHz	VHT-OFDM	802.11ac (Wi-Fi 5)	December 2013	5	20	Up to 693	8	DL; MU-MIMO OFDM (256-QAM)	35 m (115 ft)	?
1–7 GHz	VHT-OFDM	802.11ac (Wi-Fi 5)	December 2013	5	40	Up to 1,600	8	DL; MU-MIMO OFDM (256-QAM)	35 m (115 ft)	?
1–7 GHz	VHT-OFDM	802.11ac (Wi-Fi 5)	December 2013	5	80	Up to 3,467	8	DL; MU-MIMO OFDM (256-QAM)	35 m (115 ft)	?
1–7 GHz	VHT-OFDM	802.11ac (Wi-Fi 5)	December 2013	5	160	Up to 6,933	8	DL; MU-MIMO OFDM (256-QAM)	35 m (115 ft)	?
1–7 GHz	HE-OFDMA	802.11ax (Wi-Fi 6, Wi-Fi 6E)	May 2021	2.4, 5, 6	20	Up to 1,147 (Note: For single-user cases only, based on default guard interval which is 0.8 microseconds. Since multi-user via OFDMA has become available for 802.11ax, these may decrease. Also, these theoretical values depend on the link distance, whether the link is line-of-sight or not, interferences and the multi-path components in the environment.)	8	UL/DL; MU-MIMO OFDMA (1024-QAM)	30 m (98 ft)	120 m (390 ft) (Note: The default guard interval is 0.8 microseconds. However, 802.11ax extended the maximum available guard interval to 3.2 microseconds, in order to support outdoor communications, where the maximum possible propagation delay is larger compared to Indoor environments.)
1–7 GHz	HE-OFDMA	802.11ax (Wi-Fi 6, Wi-Fi 6E)	May 2021	2.4, 5, 6	40	Up to 2,294	8	UL/DL; MU-MIMO OFDMA (1024-QAM)	30 m (98 ft)	120 m (390 ft)
1–7 GHz	HE-OFDMA	802.11ax (Wi-Fi 6, Wi-Fi 6E)	May 2021	2.4, 5, 6	80	Up to 5,500	8	UL/DL; MU-MIMO OFDMA (1024-QAM)	30 m (98 ft)	120 m (390 ft)
1–7 GHz	HE-OFDMA	802.11ax (Wi-Fi 6, Wi-Fi 6E)	May 2021	2.4, 5, 6	80+80	Up to 11,000	8	UL/DL; MU-MIMO OFDMA (1024-QAM)	30 m (98 ft)	120 m (390 ft)
1–7 GHz	EHT-OFDMA	802.11be (Wi-Fi 7)	Sep 2024	2.4, 5, 6	80	Up to 5,764	8	UL/DL; MU-MIMO OFDMA (4096-QAM)	30 m (98 ft)	120 m (390 ft)
1–7 GHz	EHT-OFDMA	802.11be (Wi-Fi 7)	Sep 2024	2.4, 5, 6	160 (80+80)	Up to 11,500	8	UL/DL; MU-MIMO OFDMA (4096-QAM)	30 m (98 ft)	120 m (390 ft)
1–7 GHz	EHT-OFDMA	802.11be (Wi-Fi 7)	Sep 2024	2.4, 5, 6	240 (160+80)	Up to 14,282	8	UL/DL; MU-MIMO OFDMA (4096-QAM)	30 m (98 ft)	120 m (390 ft)
1–7 GHz	EHT-OFDMA	802.11be (Wi-Fi 7)	Sep 2024	2.4, 5, 6	320 (160+160)	Up to 23,059	8	UL/DL; MU-MIMO OFDMA (4096-QAM)	30 m (98 ft)	120 m (390 ft)
1–7 GHz	UHR	802.11bn (Wi-Fi 8)	May 2028 (est.)	2.4, 5, 6	320	Up to 23,059	8	Multi-link; MU-MIMO OFDM (4096-QAM)	?	?
1–7 GHz	WUR (Note: Wake-up Radio (WUR) Operation.)	802.11ba	October 2021	2.4, 5	4, 20	0.0625, 0.25 (62.5 kbit/s, 250 kbit/s)	—N/a	OOK (multi-carrier OOK)	?	?
mmWave (WiGig)	DMG	802.11ad	December 2012	60	2,160 (2.16 GHz)	Up to 8,085 (8 Gbit/s)	—N/a	~~OFDM~~, single carrier, low-power single carrier	3.3 m (11 ft)	?
mmWave (WiGig)	DMG	802.11aj	April 2018	60 (Note: For Chinese regulation.)	1,080	Up to 3,754 (3.75 Gbit/s)	—N/a	single carrier, low-power single carrier	?	?
mmWave (WiGig)	CMMG	802.11aj	April 2018	45	540, 1,080	Up to 15,015 (15 Gbit/s)	4	OFDM, single carrier	?	?
mmWave (WiGig)	EDMG	802.11ay	July 2021	60	Up to 8,640 (8.64 GHz)	Up to 303,336 (303 Gbit/s)	8	OFDM, single carrier	10 m (33 ft)	100 m (328 ft)
Sub 1 GHz (IoT)	TVHT	802.11af	February 2014	0.054– 0.79	6, 7, 8	Up to 568.9	4	MIMO-OFDM	?	?
Sub 1 GHz (IoT)	S1G	802.11ah	May 2017	0.7, 0.8, 0.9	1–16	Up to 8.67 (@2 MHz)	4	MIMO-OFDM	?	?
Light (Li-Fi)	LC (VLC/OWC)	802.11bb	November 2023	800–1000 nm	20	Up to 9.6 Gbit/s	—N/a	O-OFDM	?	?
Light (Li-Fi)	~~IR~~ (IrDA)	802.11-1997	June 1997	850–900 nm	?	1, 2	—N/a	~~PPM~~	?	?
802.11 Standard rollups
		802.11-2007 (802.11ma)	March 2007	2.4, 5		Up to 54		DSSS, OFDM		
		802.11-2012 (802.11mb)	March 2012	2.4, 5		Up to 150		DSSS, OFDM		
		802.11-2016 (802.11mc)	December 2016	2.4, 5, 60		Up to 866.7 or 6,757		DSSS, OFDM		
		802.11-2020 (802.11md)	December 2020	2.4, 5, 60		Up to 866.7 or 6,757		DSSS, OFDM		
		802.11-2024 (802.11me)	September 2024	2.4, 5, 6, 60		Up to 9,608 or 303,336		DSSS, OFDM		

== See also ==
- Classic WaveLAN (pre-802.11 hardware with a 915 MHz variant)
- DASH7
- IEEE
- LoRa another low power long range wireless communication technology
- List of WLAN channels

== Bibliography ==
- Adame, Toni; Bel, Albert; Bellalta, Boris; Barcelo, Jaume; Oliver, Miquel (2014). "IEEE 802.11AH: the WiFi approach for M2M communications". IEEE Wireless Communications. 21 (6). IEEE: 144–152. arXiv:1402.4675. Bibcode:2014IWC....21f.144A. doi:10.1109/MWC.2014.7000982. S2CID 13510385.
- Aust, Stefan; Prasad, R Venkatesha; Niemegeers, Ignas GMM (2012). "IEEE 802.11 ah: Advantages in standards and further challenges for sub 1 GHz Wi-Fi". Communications (ICC), 2012 IEEE International Conference on. IEEE. pp. 6885–6889.
- Khorov, Evgeny; Lyakhov, Andrey; Krotov, Alexander; Guschin, Andrey (2014). "A survey on IEEE 802.11 ah: an Enabling Networking Technology for Smart Cities" (PDF). Computer Communications. Elsevier. Archived from the original (PDF) on 2015-07-24.
- Sun, Weiping; Choi, Munhwan; Choi, Sunghyun (July 2013). "IEEE 802.11 ah: A Long Range 802.11 WLAN at Sub 1 GHz" (PDF). Journal of ICT Standardization. 1 (1): 83–108. doi:10.13052/jicts2245-800X.115.
- Zhou, Yuan; Wang, Haiguang; Zheng, Shoukang; Lei, Zander Zhongding (2013). "Advances in IEEE 802.11 ah standardization for machine-type communications in sub-1GHz WLAN". Communications Workshops (ICC), 2013 IEEE International Conference on. IEEE. pp. 1269–1273.
