= IEEE 802.11y-2008 =

Standard for data transfer equipment

IEEE 802.11y-2008 is an amendment to the IEEE 802.11-2007 standard that enables data transfer equipment to operate using the 802.11a protocol on a co-primary basis in the 3650 to 3700 MHz band except when near a grandfathered satellite earth station. IEEE 802.11y is only being allowed as a licensed band. It was approved for publication by the IEEE on September 26, 2008.

== Background ==
In June 2007 a "light licensing" scheme was introduced in 3650–3700 MHz band. Licensees pay a small fee for a nationwide, non-exclusive license. They then pay an additional nominal fee for each high powered base station that they deploy. Neither the client devices (which may be fixed or mobile), nor their operators require a license, but these devices must receive an enabling signal from a licensed base station before transmitting. All stations must be identifiable in the event they cause interference to incumbent operators in the band. Further, there is a requirement that multiple licensees' devices are given the opportunity to transmit in the same area using a "contention based protocol" when possible. If interference between licensees, or the devices that they have enabled, cannot be mediated by technical means, licensees are required to resolve the dispute between themselves.

== Features ==
The 3650 MHz rules allow for registered stations to operate at much higher power than traditional Wi-Fi gear (Up to 20 watts equivalent isotropically radiated power). The combination of higher power limits and enhancements made to the MAC timing in 802.11-2007, will allow for the development of standards based 802.11 devices that could operate at distances of 5 kilometres (3 mi) or more.

IEEE 802.11y adds three new concepts to 802.11-2007 base Standard:

Contention based protocol (CBP) – Enhancements have been made to the carrier sensing and energy detection mechanisms of 802.11 in order to meet the FCC's requirements for a contention based protocol.

Extended channel switch announcement (ECSA) provides a mechanism for an access point to notify the stations connected to it of its intention to change channels or to change channel bandwidth. This mechanism will allow for the WLAN to continuously choose the channel that is the least noisy and the least likely to cause interference. ECSA also provides for other functionalities besides dynamic channel selection based on quality & noise characteristics.

For instance, in 802.11y Amendment, the licensed operator can send ECSA commands to any stations operating under their control, registered or unregistered. ECSA is also used in 802.11n. In the 802.11n D2.0 implementation (which is shipping & undergoes Wi-Fi Alliance testing) 20 MHz & 40 MHz channel switching is provided for by the 11n PHY's ECSA implementation. Note that 802.11n is specified for operation in the 2.4 GHz and 5 GHz license exempt bands – but future amendments could permit 11n's PHY to operate in other bands as well.

Dependent station enablement (DSE) is the mechanism by which an operator extends and retracts permission to license exempt devices (referred to as dependent STAs in .11y) to use licensed radio spectrum. Fundamentally, this process satisfies a regulatory requirement that dictates that a dependent STAs operation is contingent upon its ability to receive periodic messages from a licensees base station, but DSE is extensible to other purposes in regards to channel management and coordination.

Some of the benefits of DSE include:

- The enabling station (aka the licensee's base station) may or may not be the access point that the dependent STA connects to. In fact, an enabling station may enable both an access point and its clients. Also, although the dependent STAs are required by regulation to receive information from the enabling station over the air, they are not required to transmit over the air to complete the DSE process. A dependent STA may connect to a nearby Access Point for a short period of time and use the internet or some other means to complete the channel permissioning process with the enabling station. This flexibility reduces the likelihood of a dependent STA causing interference while attempting to connect to a far off enabling station.
- The personal privacy and security of end users are ensured while, at the same time, licensees will have the information necessary to resolve disputes. All .11y devices transmit a unique identifier for the purpose of resolving interference. The high powered fixed stations and enabling stations transmit the location that they are operating from as their unique identifier. This location is also registered in an FCC database that will identify the licensee. The dependent STAs broadcast the location of the station that enabled it plus a unique string supplied by the enabling station. This ensures that the responsible party, the licensee, is contacted to resolve disputes. This mechanism also alleviates the problems associated with having the dependent STA broadcasting its location. Requiring all devices to have GPS or some other means of verifying their location would increase the cost and complexity of devices, and this solution may be inadequate indoors. This method also resolves fears that a mobile devices that constantly beacons its location could be used inappropriately by third parties to track a user's location.

== Beyond the 3650 band ==
While the scope of 802.11y was limited to operation in the US 3650–3700 MHz band in the US, care was taken so that, if the light licensing concept was well received, it would not be necessary to start the 3+ year task group process in order for 802.11y devices to operate in other countries or in other frequency bands. As a result, lightly licensed 802.11 devices will be able to operate in any 5, 10, or 20 MHz channel that regulators make available by simply adding entries to the country and regulatory information tables in Annex I and J of 802.11.

Other potential bands for 802.11y include:

4.9 GHz – The regulatory classes and channel sizing needed to support the US public safety allocation at 4.9 GHz were added to 802.11-2007. DSE and ECSA will allow frequency coordinators to have dynamic control over channel access.

5 GHz – Regulators and equipment manufacturers continue to debate the effectiveness of dynamic frequency selection (DFS) as a mechanism to avoid incumbent users in the 5 GHz bands. For example, Canada is not currently certifying 802.11 equipment for use in the 5600–5650 MHz band that is used by certain types of weather radars. 802.11y may provide a solution that will allow WLANs access to these bands. Firstly, DSE can be used to create exclusion zones around incumbent users; Secondly, when combined with DSE, the 802.11y device identification mechanism allows devices that cause interference to be denied further access to a channel within seconds.

IMT-Advanced candidate bands (450–862, 2300–2400, 2700–2900, 3400–4200, and 4400–5000 MHz) – Since 2003, the International Telecommunication Union (ITU) has been studying the potential for IMT-advanced services (aka systems beyond IMT-2000 or 4G) to use a number of frequencies between 450 and 5000 MHz for the next generation of cellular infrastructure. These systems will be capable of transmitting 100 Mb/s when mobile and 1000 Mb/s while stationary. Unfortunately, with the exception of a small amount of UHF spectrum that will become available upon the completion of the transition from analogue to digital television, these bands are occupied on a piecemeal basis by incumbent users that are not easily relocated. Extensive sharing studies have concluded that co-existence with legacy equipment over the same area is not feasible, so traditional mobile licensing approaches are not practical. Yet academic studies have shown that at any give time, even in dense urban environment, there is ample unused spectrum across the candidate bands. The problem is that usage by the primary services in these bands may change over time (as is the case with some radar systems) or vary by sub-channel based on location (as is the case in the TV bands "white spaces") 802.11y, along with the continued advances in multi-band radio technology, may provide a solution to this problem by granting channel access dynamically to users based on primary user avoidance techniques, location and time.

It is of note that the US has not been able to adopt a single position on the suitability of the 3650–3700 band for IMT-advanced, and that neither of the proposed positions seem to recognize the FCC's rules, or the standardization work that has been done to date.

== Applications ==
- Back haul for Municipal Wi-Fi networks
- Industrial automation and controls
- Campus and enterprise networking
- Last Mile Wireless Broadband Access
- Fixed Point to point links
- Fixed point to mobile links
- Public safety and security networks
- Wireless community networks or Wireless User Groups

== Regulatory & 802.11y time-line ==
- In 1995, NTIA (as per an OMB report) suggests the "transfer" of the 3650 MHz to 3700 MHz frequency band to "mixed use" status
- Dec 1998: FCC's "3650 Allocation" press release announces this "primary" to "mixed use" transition, Dec 17 1998 (Kennard's FCC.. see FCC 98-337)
- Jan 1999: The spectrum from 3650 to 3700 is given "mixed-use status" and becomes available for non-federal use
- Apr 2004: Original NPRM dated 04/23/2004 (FCC-04-100) from Powell's FCC.. Titled "Unlicensed Operation in the Band 3650–3700 MHz et al.". This is the proposed rules to maximize the efficient use of the 3650–3700 band and foster the introduction of new and advanced services
- Mar 2005: FCC releases R&O (from EOT) dated 03/16/2005, (FCC-05-56) which describes in detail the use of the 3650 band and is titled "Wireless Operations in the 3650–3700 MHz Band; Rules for Wireless Broadband Services in the 3650–3700 MHz Band"
- Mar 2005: 802.11's WNG requests that a CBP study group be formed (CBP-SG) to examine the opportunities afforded by FCC's 3650 MHz Report and Order and Memorandum Opinion and Order (FCC 05-56).
- Nov 2005: The PAR and Five Criteria from the CBP-SG are approved by the 802 Executive Committee creating the 802.11y Task Group.
- Jan 2007: First letter ballot received greater than 75% approval from 802.11 WG
- Jun 2007: This is the FCC's MO&O dated 06/07/2007 from OET (FCC-07-99) in which the Commission addresses the many petitions for reconsideration and other filings that resulted from FCC's 05-56 Report and Order see above.
- Jun 2007: Draft 3.0 received 94% approval from 802.11 WG
- Jul 2007: Conditional approval was obtained from the 802.11 Working Group and granted by the Executive Committee to forward .11y to sponsor ballot.
- Aug 2007: Last ex parte comment filed on proceeding 04-151 in response to FCC's NPRM and R&O describing operations in the 3650 band. Almost 450 comments are filed. See WISPA's filing for example.
- Nov 2007: FCC begins providing the means, via FCC's Universal Licensing System, to allow non-Federal operators to purchase non-exclusive nationwide licenses to allow for licensed operations in the 3650 Band. Licensee call signs are assigned upon approval of application.
- Dec 21, 2007: IEEE/ISO Sponsor Ballot process begins for the 802.11 amendment y Standard using Draft 7 of the amendment.
- Jun 5 2008: Start of final 15-day Sponsor Ballot Recirc (#4) to seek approval of a Draft 11 after small Clause 17 edit. This draft will be forwarded to RevCom and the IEEE SA's Standards Board for approval and publication.
- Sep 26 2008: P802.11y is approved as a new standard during the IEEE-SA Standards Board's meeting that took place on this date. The final draft document for amendment y is forwarded to the IEEE's Standards Publications Department in preparation for printing. This Standard took about 31 "participant weeks" over 2.5 years to draft and ballot 74 pages and resolve 1638 comments for this amendment to the 802.11 Base Standard.

== Comparison chart ==
802.11 network standards
Frequency range, or type	PHY	Protocol	Release date	Frequency band	Channel width	Stream data rate	Max. MIMO streams	Modulation	Approx. range	
Frequency range, or type	PHY	Protocol	Release date	Frequency band	Channel width	Stream data rate	Max. MIMO streams	Modulation	Indoor	Outdoor
Frequency range, or type	PHY	Protocol	Release date	(GHz)	(MHz)	(Mbit/s)	Max. MIMO streams	Modulation	Indoor	Outdoor
1–7 GHz	DSSS, ~~FHSS~~ (Note: This is obsolete, and support for this might be subject to removal in a future revision of the standard)	802.11-1997	June 1997	2.4	22	1, 2	—N/a	DSSS, ~~FHSS~~	20 m (66 ft)	100 m (330 ft)
1–7 GHz	HR/DSSS	802.11b	September 1999	2.4	22	1, 2, 5.5, 11	—N/a	CCK, DSSS	35 m (115 ft)	140 m (460 ft)
1–7 GHz	OFDM	802.11a	September 1999	5	5, 10, 20	6, 9, 12, 18, 24, 36, 48, 54 (for 20 MHz bandwidth, divide by 2 and 4 for 10 and 5 MHz)	—N/a	OFDM	35 m (115 ft)	120 m (390 ft)
1–7 GHz	OFDM	802.11j	November 2004	4.9, 5.0 (Note: For Japanese regulation.)	5, 10, 20	6, 9, 12, 18, 24, 36, 48, 54 (for 20 MHz bandwidth, divide by 2 and 4 for 10 and 5 MHz)	—N/a	OFDM	?	?
1–7 GHz	OFDM	802.11y	November 2008	3.7 (Note: IEEE 802.11y-2008 extended operation of 802.11a to the licensed 3.7 GHz band. Increased power limits allow a range up to 5,000 m. As of 2009, it is only being licensed in the United States by the FCC.)	5, 10, 20	6, 9, 12, 18, 24, 36, 48, 54 (for 20 MHz bandwidth, divide by 2 and 4 for 10 and 5 MHz)	—N/a	OFDM	?	5,000 m (16,000 ft)
1–7 GHz	OFDM	802.11p	July 2010	5.9	5, 10, 20	6, 9, 12, 18, 24, 36, 48, 54 (for 20 MHz bandwidth, divide by 2 and 4 for 10 and 5 MHz)	—N/a	OFDM	200 m	1,000 m (3,300 ft)
1–7 GHz	OFDM	802.11bd	December 2022	5.9, 60	5, 10, 20	6, 9, 12, 18, 24, 36, 48, 54 (for 20 MHz bandwidth, divide by 2 and 4 for 10 and 5 MHz)	—N/a	OFDM	500 m	1,000 m (3,300 ft)
1–7 GHz	ERP-OFDM	802.11g	June 2003	2.4	5, 10, 20	6, 9, 12, 18, 24, 36, 48, 54 (for 20 MHz bandwidth, divide by 2 and 4 for 10 and 5 MHz)	—N/a	OFDM	38 m (125 ft)	140 m (460 ft)
1–7 GHz	HT-OFDM	802.11n (Wi-Fi 4)	October 2009	2.4, 5	20	Up to 288.8 (Note: Based on short guard interval; standard guard interval is ~10% slower. Rates vary widely based on distance, obstructions, and interference.)	4	MIMO-OFDM (64-QAM)	70 m (230 ft)	250 m (820 ft)
1–7 GHz	HT-OFDM	802.11n (Wi-Fi 4)	October 2009	2.4, 5	40	Up to 600	4	MIMO-OFDM (64-QAM)	70 m (230 ft)	250 m (820 ft)
1–7 GHz	VHT-OFDM	802.11ac (Wi-Fi 5)	December 2013	5	20	Up to 693	8	DL; MU-MIMO OFDM (256-QAM)	35 m (115 ft)	?
1–7 GHz	VHT-OFDM	802.11ac (Wi-Fi 5)	December 2013	5	40	Up to 1,600	8	DL; MU-MIMO OFDM (256-QAM)	35 m (115 ft)	?
1–7 GHz	VHT-OFDM	802.11ac (Wi-Fi 5)	December 2013	5	80	Up to 3,467	8	DL; MU-MIMO OFDM (256-QAM)	35 m (115 ft)	?
1–7 GHz	VHT-OFDM	802.11ac (Wi-Fi 5)	December 2013	5	160	Up to 6,933	8	DL; MU-MIMO OFDM (256-QAM)	35 m (115 ft)	?
1–7 GHz	HE-OFDMA	802.11ax (Wi-Fi 6, Wi-Fi 6E)	May 2021	2.4, 5, 6	20	Up to 1,147 (Note: For single-user cases only, based on default guard interval which is 0.8 microseconds. Since multi-user via OFDMA has become available for 802.11ax, these may decrease. Also, these theoretical values depend on the link distance, whether the link is line-of-sight or not, interferences and the multi-path components in the environment.)	8	UL/DL; MU-MIMO OFDMA (1024-QAM)	30 m (98 ft)	120 m (390 ft) (Note: The default guard interval is 0.8 microseconds. However, 802.11ax extended the maximum available guard interval to 3.2 microseconds, in order to support outdoor communications, where the maximum possible propagation delay is larger compared to Indoor environments.)
1–7 GHz	HE-OFDMA	802.11ax (Wi-Fi 6, Wi-Fi 6E)	May 2021	2.4, 5, 6	40	Up to 2,294	8	UL/DL; MU-MIMO OFDMA (1024-QAM)	30 m (98 ft)	120 m (390 ft)
1–7 GHz	HE-OFDMA	802.11ax (Wi-Fi 6, Wi-Fi 6E)	May 2021	2.4, 5, 6	80	Up to 5,500	8	UL/DL; MU-MIMO OFDMA (1024-QAM)	30 m (98 ft)	120 m (390 ft)
1–7 GHz	HE-OFDMA	802.11ax (Wi-Fi 6, Wi-Fi 6E)	May 2021	2.4, 5, 6	80+80	Up to 11,000	8	UL/DL; MU-MIMO OFDMA (1024-QAM)	30 m (98 ft)	120 m (390 ft)
1–7 GHz	EHT-OFDMA	802.11be (Wi-Fi 7)	Sep 2024	2.4, 5, 6	80	Up to 5,764	8	UL/DL; MU-MIMO OFDMA (4096-QAM)	30 m (98 ft)	120 m (390 ft)
1–7 GHz	EHT-OFDMA	802.11be (Wi-Fi 7)	Sep 2024	2.4, 5, 6	160 (80+80)	Up to 11,500	8	UL/DL; MU-MIMO OFDMA (4096-QAM)	30 m (98 ft)	120 m (390 ft)
1–7 GHz	EHT-OFDMA	802.11be (Wi-Fi 7)	Sep 2024	2.4, 5, 6	240 (160+80)	Up to 14,282	8	UL/DL; MU-MIMO OFDMA (4096-QAM)	30 m (98 ft)	120 m (390 ft)
1–7 GHz	EHT-OFDMA	802.11be (Wi-Fi 7)	Sep 2024	2.4, 5, 6	320 (160+160)	Up to 23,059	8	UL/DL; MU-MIMO OFDMA (4096-QAM)	30 m (98 ft)	120 m (390 ft)
1–7 GHz	UHR	802.11bn (Wi-Fi 8)	May 2028 (est.)	2.4, 5, 6	320	Up to 23,059	8	Multi-link; MU-MIMO OFDM (4096-QAM)	?	?
1–7 GHz	WUR (Note: Wake-up Radio (WUR) Operation.)	802.11ba	October 2021	2.4, 5	4, 20	0.0625, 0.25 (62.5 kbit/s, 250 kbit/s)	—N/a	OOK (multi-carrier OOK)	?	?
mmWave (WiGig)	DMG	802.11ad	December 2012	60	2,160 (2.16 GHz)	Up to 8,085 (8 Gbit/s)	—N/a	~~OFDM~~, single carrier, low-power single carrier	3.3 m (11 ft)	?
mmWave (WiGig)	DMG	802.11aj	April 2018	60 (Note: For Chinese regulation.)	1,080	Up to 3,754 (3.75 Gbit/s)	—N/a	single carrier, low-power single carrier	?	?
mmWave (WiGig)	CMMG	802.11aj	April 2018	45	540, 1,080	Up to 15,015 (15 Gbit/s)	4	OFDM, single carrier	?	?
mmWave (WiGig)	EDMG	802.11ay	July 2021	60	Up to 8,640 (8.64 GHz)	Up to 303,336 (303 Gbit/s)	8	OFDM, single carrier	10 m (33 ft)	100 m (328 ft)
Sub 1 GHz (IoT)	TVHT	802.11af	February 2014	0.054– 0.79	6, 7, 8	Up to 568.9	4	MIMO-OFDM	?	?
Sub 1 GHz (IoT)	S1G	802.11ah	May 2017	0.7, 0.8, 0.9	1–16	Up to 8.67 (@2 MHz)	4	MIMO-OFDM	?	?
Light (Li-Fi)	LC (VLC/OWC)	802.11bb	November 2023	800–1000 nm	20	Up to 9.6 Gbit/s	—N/a	O-OFDM	?	?
Light (Li-Fi)	~~IR~~ (IrDA)	802.11-1997	June 1997	850–900 nm	?	1, 2	—N/a	~~PPM~~	?	?
802.11 Standard rollups
		802.11-2007 (802.11ma)	March 2007	2.4, 5		Up to 54		DSSS, OFDM		
		802.11-2012 (802.11mb)	March 2012	2.4, 5		Up to 150		DSSS, OFDM		
		802.11-2016 (802.11mc)	December 2016	2.4, 5, 60		Up to 866.7 or 6,757		DSSS, OFDM		
		802.11-2020 (802.11md)	December 2020	2.4, 5, 60		Up to 866.7 or 6,757		DSSS, OFDM		
		802.11-2024 (802.11me)	September 2024	2.4, 5, 6, 60		Up to 9,608 or 303,336		DSSS, OFDM		
