= Wi-Fi 6 =

Wireless networking standard

- Icon used by the Wi-Fi Alliance for Wi-Fi 6
- Introduced: 1 September 2020; 6 years ago
- Compatible hardware: Personal computers, gaming consoles, smart devices, televisions, printers, security cameras
- Website: https://www.wi-fi.org/wi-fi-6

Wi-Fi and IEEE 802.11 generations
Genera- tion	IEEE standard	Adopt- ed	Link rate (Mbit/s)	Frequency (GHz)		
Genera- tion	IEEE standard	Adopt- ed	Link rate (Mbit/s)	2.4	5	6
—	802.11	1997	1–2	Yes		
—	802.11b	1999	1–11	Yes		
—	802.11a	1999	6–54		Yes	
—	802.11g	2003	6–54	Yes		
Wi-Fi 4	802.11n	2009	6.5–600	Yes	Yes	
Wi-Fi 5	802.11ac	2013	6.5–6,933	(Note: 802.11ac only specifies operation in the 5 GHz band. Operation in the 2.4 GHz band is specified by 802.11n.)	Yes	
Wi-Fi 6	802.11ax	2021	0.4–9,608	Yes	Yes	
Wi-Fi 6E	802.11ax	2021	0.4–9,608	Yes	Yes	Yes
Wi-Fi 7	802.11be	2024	0.4–23,059	Yes	Yes	Yes
Wi-Fi 8	802.11bn	TBA	0.4–23,059	Yes	Yes	Yes

IEEE 802.11ax-2021, or 802.11ax, is an IEEE standard from the Wi-Fi Alliance for wireless networks (WLANs). The standard is marketed as Wi-Fi 6. It operates in the 2.4 GHz and 5 GHz bands, with an extended version, Wi-Fi 6E, that adds the 6 GHz band; these are license-exempt ISM bands. It is an upgrade from Wi-Fi 5 (IEEE 802.11ac), with improvements for better performance in crowded places.

This standard aims to boost throughput (Note: Throughput-per-area, as defined by IEEE, is the ratio of the total network throughput to the network area.) in crowded places like offices and malls. Though the nominal data rate is only 37% higher than that of Wi-Fi 5, the throughput increases by at least four times, making it more efficient and reducing latency by 75%. The quintupling of overall throughput is made possible by higher spectral efficiency.

Wi-Fi 6 has a main feature called OFDMA, similar to how cellular common-carrier networks work. This brings better spectrum use, improved power control to avoid interference, and enhancements like 1024‑QAM, MIMO and MU-MIMO for faster speeds. There are also reliability improvements such as lower power consumption and security protocols like Target Wake Time and WPA3.

The 802.11ax standard was approved on September 1, 2020, with Draft 8 getting 95% approval. Subsequently, on February 1, 2021, the standard received official endorsement from the IEEE Standards Board.

== Rate set ==
Modulation and coding schemes
MCS index (Note: MCS 9 is not applicable to all combinations of channel width and spatial stream count.)	Modulation type	Coding rate	Data rate (Mbit/s) (Note: Per spatial stream.)							
MCS index	Modulation type	Coding rate	Channel width (MHz)							
MCS index	Modulation type	Coding rate	20		40		80		160	
MCS index	Modulation type	Coding rate	Guard Interval (μs)							
MCS index	Modulation type	Coding rate	1.6	0.8	1.6	0.8	1.6	0.8	1.6	0.8
0	BPSK	1/2	8	8.6	16	17.2	34	36.0	68	72
1	QPSK	1/2	16	17.2	33	34.4	68	72.1	136	144
2	QPSK	3/4	24	25.8	49	51.6	102	108.1	204	216
3	16-QAM	1/2	33	34.4	65	68.8	136	144.1	272	288
4	16-QAM	3/4	49	51.6	98	103.2	204	216.2	408	432
5	64-QAM	2/3	65	68.8	130	137.6	272	288.2	544	576
6	64-QAM	3/4	73	77.4	146	154.9	306	324.4	613	649
7	64-QAM	5/6	81	86.0	163	172.1	340	360.3	681	721
8	256-QAM	3/4	98	103.2	195	206.5	408	432.4	817	865
9	256-QAM	5/6	108	114.7	217	229.4	453	480.4	907	961
10	1024-QAM	3/4	122	129.0	244	258.1	510	540.4	1021	1081
11	1024-QAM	5/6	135	143.4	271	286.8	567	600.5	1134	1201

== MU-MIMO and OFDMA ==
With the previous generation Wi-Fi 5, multi-user MIMO was introduced, which is a spatial multiplexing technique. MU-MIMO allows the access point to form beams towards each client, while transmitting information simultaneously. By doing so, the interference between clients is reduced, and the overall throughput is increased, since multiple clients can receive data simultaneously.

With Wi-Fi 6, a similar multiplexing is introduced in the frequency-division multiplexing: OFDMA. With OFDMA, multiple clients are assigned to different Resource Units in the available spectrum. By doing so, an 80 MHz channel can be split into multiple Resource Units, so that multiple clients receive different types of data over the same spectrum, simultaneously.

To support OFDMA, Wi-Fi 6 needs four times as many subcarriers as Wi-Fi 5. Specifically, for 20, 40, 80, and 160 MHz channels, the 802.11ac standard has, respectively, 64, 128, 256 and 512 subcarriers while the 802.11ax standard has 256, 512, 1024, and 2048 subcarriers. Since the available bandwidths have not changed and the number of subcarriers increases by a factor of four, the subcarrier spacing is reduced by the same factor. This introduces OFDM symbols that are four times longer: with Wi-Fi 5, an OFDM symbol takes 3.2 microseconds to transmit. With Wi-Fi 6, it takes 12.8 microseconds (both without guard intervals).

== Technical improvements ==
The 802.11ax amendment brings several key improvements over 802.11ac. While 802.11ac only uses the 5 GHz band, which is a bit over 700 MHz wide, 802.11ax also allows the use of the 2.4 GHz band of some earlier protocols, less than 100 MHz wide, and the larger 6 GHz band, about 1200 MHz wide. Wi-Fi 6E adds to Wi‑Fi 6 the use of the 6 GHz band and, thereby, channels that are 160 MHz wide without the restrictions of Dynamic Frequency Selection that apply to all 160 MHz channels in the 5 GHz band. The number and selection of channels available depends on the country a given Wi-Fi 6 network operates in. To meet the goal of supporting dense 802.11 deployments, the following features have been approved.

Feature	Wi-Fi 5	Wi-Fi 6	Comment
OFDMA	not available	Centrally controlled medium access with dynamic assignment of 26, 52, 106, 242(?), 484(?), or 996(?) tones per station. Each tone consists of a single subcarrier of 78.125 kHz bandwidth. Therefore, a single OFDMA transmission is between 2.03125 MHz and ca. 80 MHz wide.	OFDMA segregates the spectrum in time-frequency resource units (RUs). A central coordinating entity (the AP in 802.11ax) assigns RUs for reception or transmission to associated stations. Through the central scheduling of the RUs, contention overhead can be avoided, which increases efficiency in scenarios of dense deployments.
Multi-user MIMO (MU-MIMO)	Available in Downlink direction	Available in Downlink and Uplink direction	With downlink MU-MIMO an AP may transmit concurrently with multiple stations, and with uplink MU-MIMO an AP may simultaneously receive from multiple stations. Whereas OFDMA separates receivers to different RUs, with MU-MIMO the devices are separated into different spatial streams. In 802.11ax, MU-MIMO and OFDMA can be used simultaneously. To enable uplink MU transmissions, the AP transmits a new control frame (Trigger) which contains scheduling information (RU allocations for stations, and the modulation and coding scheme (MCS) that shall be used for each station). Furthermore, a Trigger also provides synchronization for an uplink transmission, since the transmission starts SIFS after the end of a Trigger.
Trigger-based Random Access	not available	Allows performing UL OFDMA transmissions by stations which are not allocated RUs directly	In a Trigger frame, the AP specifies scheduling information about subsequent UL MU transmission. However, several RUs can be assigned for random access. Stations which are not assigned RUs directly can perform transmissions within RUs assigned for random access. To reduce collision probability (i.e. situation when two or more stations select the same RU for transmission), the 802.11ax amendment specifies a special OFDMA back-off procedure. Random access is favorable for transmitting buffer status reports when the AP has no information about pending UL traffic at a station.
Spatial frequency reuse	not available	Coloring enables devices to differentiate transmissions in their own network from transmissions in neighboring networks. Adaptive power and sensitivity thresholds allow dynamically adjusting transmit power and signal detection threshold to increase spatial reuse.	Without spatial reuse capabilities devices refuse transmitting concurrently with transmissions in neighboring networks. With basic service set coloring (BSS coloring), a wireless transmission is marked at its very beginning, helping surrounding devices to decide if a simultaneous use of the wireless medium is permissible. A station is allowed to consider the wireless medium idle and start a new transmission even if the detected signal level from a neighboring network exceeds the legacy signal detection threshold, provided that the transmit power for the new transmission is appropriately decreased.
NAV	Single NAV	Dual NAVs	In dense deployment scenarios, the NAV (network allocation vector) value set by a frame from one network may be easily reset by a frame from another network, which leads to misbehavior and collisions. To avoid this, each 802.11ax station will maintain two separate NAVs: One NAV is modified by frames from a network the station is associated with, while the other NAV is modified by frames from overlapping networks.
Target Wake Time (TWT)	not available	TWT reduces power consumption and medium access contention.	TWT is a concept developed in 802.11ah. It allows devices to wake up at times other than the periodic beacon transmission time. Furthermore, the AP may group devices with various TWT periods, thereby reducing the number of devices contending simultaneously for the wireless medium.
Fragmentation	Static	Dynamic	With static fragmentation, all fragments of a data packet are of equal size, except for the last fragment. With dynamic fragmentation, a device may fill available RUs of other opportunities to transmit up to the available maximum duration. Thus, dynamic fragmentation helps reduce overhead.
Guard interval duration	0.4 or 0.8 μs	0.8, 1.6 or 3.2 μs	Extended guard interval durations allow for better protection against signal delay spread as it occurs in outdoor environments.
Symbol duration	3.2 μs	12.8 μs	Since the subcarrier spacing is reduced by a factor of four, the OFDM symbol duration is increased by a factor of four as well. Extended symbol durations allow for increased efficiency.
Frequency bands	5 GHz only	2.4 and 5 GHz	802.11ac falls back to 802.11n for the 2.4 GHz band.

== Adoption ==
Following the ratification of the IEEE 802.11ax standard in February 2021, Wi-Fi 6 saw rapid adoption across consumer and enterprise devices. The Wi-Fi Alliance began certifying Wi-Fi 6 devices under its Wi-Fi CERTIFIED 6 program in September 2019, ahead of the standard's formal approval. Major smartphone, laptop, and router manufacturers incorporated Wi-Fi 6 support into their product lines beginning in 2020.

== Comparison ==
802.11 network standards
Frequency range, or type	PHY	Protocol	Release date	Frequency band	Channel width	Stream data rate	Max. MIMO streams	Modulation	Approx. range	
Frequency range, or type	PHY	Protocol	Release date	Frequency band	Channel width	Stream data rate	Max. MIMO streams	Modulation	Indoor	Outdoor
Frequency range, or type	PHY	Protocol	Release date	(GHz)	(MHz)	(Mbit/s)	Max. MIMO streams	Modulation	Indoor	Outdoor
1–7 GHz	DSSS, ~~FHSS~~ (Note: This is obsolete, and support for this might be subject to removal in a future revision of the standard)	802.11-1997	June 1997	2.4	22	1, 2	—N/a	DSSS, ~~FHSS~~	20 m (66 ft)	100 m (330 ft)
1–7 GHz	HR/DSSS	802.11b	September 1999	2.4	22	1, 2, 5.5, 11	—N/a	CCK, DSSS	35 m (115 ft)	140 m (460 ft)
1–7 GHz	OFDM	802.11a	September 1999	5	5, 10, 20	6, 9, 12, 18, 24, 36, 48, 54 (for 20 MHz bandwidth, divide by 2 and 4 for 10 and 5 MHz)	—N/a	OFDM	35 m (115 ft)	120 m (390 ft)
1–7 GHz	OFDM	802.11j	November 2004	4.9, 5.0 (Note: For Japanese regulation.)	5, 10, 20	6, 9, 12, 18, 24, 36, 48, 54 (for 20 MHz bandwidth, divide by 2 and 4 for 10 and 5 MHz)	—N/a	OFDM	?	?
1–7 GHz	OFDM	802.11y	November 2008	3.7 (Note: IEEE 802.11y-2008 extended operation of 802.11a to the licensed 3.7 GHz band. Increased power limits allow a range up to 5,000 m. As of 2009, it is only being licensed in the United States by the FCC.)	5, 10, 20	6, 9, 12, 18, 24, 36, 48, 54 (for 20 MHz bandwidth, divide by 2 and 4 for 10 and 5 MHz)	—N/a	OFDM	?	5,000 m (16,000 ft)
1–7 GHz	OFDM	802.11p	July 2010	5.9	5, 10, 20	6, 9, 12, 18, 24, 36, 48, 54 (for 20 MHz bandwidth, divide by 2 and 4 for 10 and 5 MHz)	—N/a	OFDM	200 m	1,000 m (3,300 ft)
1–7 GHz	OFDM	802.11bd	December 2022	5.9, 60	5, 10, 20	6, 9, 12, 18, 24, 36, 48, 54 (for 20 MHz bandwidth, divide by 2 and 4 for 10 and 5 MHz)	—N/a	OFDM	500 m	1,000 m (3,300 ft)
1–7 GHz	ERP-OFDM	802.11g	June 2003	2.4	5, 10, 20	6, 9, 12, 18, 24, 36, 48, 54 (for 20 MHz bandwidth, divide by 2 and 4 for 10 and 5 MHz)	—N/a	OFDM	38 m (125 ft)	140 m (460 ft)
1–7 GHz	HT-OFDM	802.11n (Wi-Fi 4)	October 2009	2.4, 5	20	Up to 288.8 (Note: Based on short guard interval; standard guard interval is ~10% slower. Rates vary widely based on distance, obstructions, and interference.)	4	MIMO-OFDM (64-QAM)	70 m (230 ft)	250 m (820 ft)
1–7 GHz	HT-OFDM	802.11n (Wi-Fi 4)	October 2009	2.4, 5	40	Up to 600	4	MIMO-OFDM (64-QAM)	70 m (230 ft)	250 m (820 ft)
1–7 GHz	VHT-OFDM	802.11ac (Wi-Fi 5)	December 2013	5	20	Up to 693	8	DL; MU-MIMO OFDM (256-QAM)	35 m (115 ft)	?
1–7 GHz	VHT-OFDM	802.11ac (Wi-Fi 5)	December 2013	5	40	Up to 1,600	8	DL; MU-MIMO OFDM (256-QAM)	35 m (115 ft)	?
1–7 GHz	VHT-OFDM	802.11ac (Wi-Fi 5)	December 2013	5	80	Up to 3,467	8	DL; MU-MIMO OFDM (256-QAM)	35 m (115 ft)	?
1–7 GHz	VHT-OFDM	802.11ac (Wi-Fi 5)	December 2013	5	160	Up to 6,933	8	DL; MU-MIMO OFDM (256-QAM)	35 m (115 ft)	?
1–7 GHz	HE-OFDMA	802.11ax (Wi-Fi 6, Wi-Fi 6E)	May 2021	2.4, 5, 6	20	Up to 1,147 (Note: For single-user cases only, based on default guard interval which is 0.8 microseconds. Since multi-user via OFDMA has become available for 802.11ax, these may decrease. Also, these theoretical values depend on the link distance, whether the link is line-of-sight or not, interferences and the multi-path components in the environment.)	8	UL/DL; MU-MIMO OFDMA (1024-QAM)	30 m (98 ft)	120 m (390 ft) (Note: The default guard interval is 0.8 microseconds. However, 802.11ax extended the maximum available guard interval to 3.2 microseconds, in order to support outdoor communications, where the maximum possible propagation delay is larger compared to Indoor environments.)
1–7 GHz	HE-OFDMA	802.11ax (Wi-Fi 6, Wi-Fi 6E)	May 2021	2.4, 5, 6	40	Up to 2,294	8	UL/DL; MU-MIMO OFDMA (1024-QAM)	30 m (98 ft)	120 m (390 ft)
1–7 GHz	HE-OFDMA	802.11ax (Wi-Fi 6, Wi-Fi 6E)	May 2021	2.4, 5, 6	80	Up to 5,500	8	UL/DL; MU-MIMO OFDMA (1024-QAM)	30 m (98 ft)	120 m (390 ft)
1–7 GHz	HE-OFDMA	802.11ax (Wi-Fi 6, Wi-Fi 6E)	May 2021	2.4, 5, 6	80+80	Up to 11,000	8	UL/DL; MU-MIMO OFDMA (1024-QAM)	30 m (98 ft)	120 m (390 ft)
1–7 GHz	EHT-OFDMA	802.11be (Wi-Fi 7)	Sep 2024	2.4, 5, 6	80	Up to 5,764	8	UL/DL; MU-MIMO OFDMA (4096-QAM)	30 m (98 ft)	120 m (390 ft)
1–7 GHz	EHT-OFDMA	802.11be (Wi-Fi 7)	Sep 2024	2.4, 5, 6	160 (80+80)	Up to 11,500	8	UL/DL; MU-MIMO OFDMA (4096-QAM)	30 m (98 ft)	120 m (390 ft)
1–7 GHz	EHT-OFDMA	802.11be (Wi-Fi 7)	Sep 2024	2.4, 5, 6	240 (160+80)	Up to 14,282	8	UL/DL; MU-MIMO OFDMA (4096-QAM)	30 m (98 ft)	120 m (390 ft)
1–7 GHz	EHT-OFDMA	802.11be (Wi-Fi 7)	Sep 2024	2.4, 5, 6	320 (160+160)	Up to 23,059	8	UL/DL; MU-MIMO OFDMA (4096-QAM)	30 m (98 ft)	120 m (390 ft)
1–7 GHz	UHR	802.11bn (Wi-Fi 8)	May 2028 (est.)	2.4, 5, 6	320	Up to 23,059	8	Multi-link; MU-MIMO OFDM (4096-QAM)	?	?
1–7 GHz	WUR (Note: Wake-up Radio (WUR) Operation.)	802.11ba	October 2021	2.4, 5	4, 20	0.0625, 0.25 (62.5 kbit/s, 250 kbit/s)	—N/a	OOK (multi-carrier OOK)	?	?
mmWave (WiGig)	DMG	802.11ad	December 2012	60	2,160 (2.16 GHz)	Up to 8,085 (8 Gbit/s)	—N/a	~~OFDM~~, single carrier, low-power single carrier	3.3 m (11 ft)	?
mmWave (WiGig)	DMG	802.11aj	April 2018	60 (Note: For Chinese regulation.)	1,080	Up to 3,754 (3.75 Gbit/s)	—N/a	single carrier, low-power single carrier	?	?
mmWave (WiGig)	CMMG	802.11aj	April 2018	45	540, 1,080	Up to 15,015 (15 Gbit/s)	4	OFDM, single carrier	?	?
mmWave (WiGig)	EDMG	802.11ay	July 2021	60	Up to 8,640 (8.64 GHz)	Up to 303,336 (303 Gbit/s)	8	OFDM, single carrier	10 m (33 ft)	100 m (328 ft)
Sub 1 GHz (IoT)	TVHT	802.11af	February 2014	0.054– 0.79	6, 7, 8	Up to 568.9	4	MIMO-OFDM	?	?
Sub 1 GHz (IoT)	S1G	802.11ah	May 2017	0.7, 0.8, 0.9	1–16	Up to 8.67 (@2 MHz)	4	MIMO-OFDM	?	?
Light (Li-Fi)	LC (VLC/OWC)	802.11bb	November 2023	800–1000 nm	20	Up to 9.6 Gbit/s	—N/a	O-OFDM	?	?
Light (Li-Fi)	~~IR~~ (IrDA)	802.11-1997	June 1997	850–900 nm	?	1, 2	—N/a	~~PPM~~	?	?
802.11 Standard rollups
		802.11-2007 (802.11ma)	March 2007	2.4, 5		Up to 54		DSSS, OFDM		
		802.11-2012 (802.11mb)	March 2012	2.4, 5		Up to 150		DSSS, OFDM		
		802.11-2016 (802.11mc)	December 2016	2.4, 5, 60		Up to 866.7 or 6,757		DSSS, OFDM		
		802.11-2020 (802.11md)	December 2020	2.4, 5, 60		Up to 866.7 or 6,757		DSSS, OFDM		
		802.11-2024 (802.11me)	September 2024	2.4, 5, 6, 60		Up to 9,608 or 303,336		DSSS, OFDM		
