= IEEE 802.11n =

Wireless networking standard in the 802.11 family

Wi-Fi and IEEE 802.11 generations
Gen.	IEEE standard	Adopt.	Link rate (Mbit/s)	RF (GHz)		
Gen.	IEEE standard	Adopt.	Link rate (Mbit/s)	2.4	5	6
—	802.11	1997	1–2	Yes		
—	802.11b	1999	1–11	Yes		
—	802.11a	1999	6–54		Yes	
—	802.11g	2003	6–54	Yes		
Wi-Fi 4	802.11n	2009	6.5–600	Yes	Yes	
Wi-Fi 5	802.11ac	2013	6.5–6,933	(Note: 802.11ac only specifies operation in the 5 GHz band. Operation in the 2.4 GHz band is specified by 802.11n.)	Yes	
Wi-Fi 6	802.11ax	2021	0.4–9,608	Yes	Yes	
Wi-Fi 6E	802.11ax	2021	0.4–9,608	Yes	Yes	Yes
Wi-Fi 7	802.11be	2024	0.4–23,059	Yes	Yes	Yes
Wi-Fi 8	802.11bn	TBA	0.4–23,059	Yes	Yes	Yes

IEEE 802.11n, formally IEEE 802.11n-2009 and also simply called 802.11n, is a wireless-networking standard that uses multiple antennas to increase data rates. The Wi-Fi Alliance has also retroactively labelled the technology for the standard as Wi-Fi 4. It standardized support for multiple-input multiple-output (MIMO), frame aggregation, and security improvements, among other features, and can be used in the 2.4 GHz or 5 GHz frequency bands.

Being the first Wi-Fi standard to introduce MIMO support, devices and systems which supported the 802.11n standard (or draft versions thereof) were sometimes referred to as MIMO Wi-Fi products, especially prior to the introduction of the next generation standard. The use of MIMO-OFDM (orthogonal frequency division multiplexing) to increase the data rate while maintaining the same spectrum as 802.11a was first demonstrated by Airgo Networks.

The purpose of the standard is to improve network throughput over the two previous standards—802.11a and 802.11g—with a significant increase in the maximum net data rate from 54 Mbit/s to 72 Mbit/s with a single spatial stream in a 20 MHz channel, and 600 Mbit/s (slightly higher gross bit rate including for example error-correction codes, and slightly lower maximum throughput) with the use of four spatial streams at a channel width of 40 MHz.

IEEE 802.11n-2009 is an amendment to the IEEE 802.11-2007 wireless-networking standard. 802.11 is a set of IEEE standards that govern wireless networking transmission methods. They are commonly used today in their 802.11a, 802.11b, 802.11g, 802.11n, 802.11ac and 802.11ax versions to provide wireless connectivity in homes and businesses. Development of 802.11n began in 2002, seven years before publication. The 802.11n protocol is now Clause 20 of the published IEEE 802.11-2012 standard and subsequently renamed to clause 19 of the published IEEE 802.11-2020 standard.

== Description ==
IEEE 802.11n is an amendment to IEEE 802.11-2007 as amended by IEEE 802.11k-2008, IEEE 802.11r-2008, IEEE 802.11y-2008, and IEEE 802.11w-2009, and builds on previous 802.11 standards by adding a multiple-input multiple-output (MIMO) system and 40 MHz channels to the PHY (physical layer) and frame aggregation to the MAC layer. There were older proprietary implementations of MIMO and 40MHz channels such as Xpress, Super G and Nitro which were based upon 802.11g and 802.11a technology, but this was the first time it was standardized across all radio manufacturers.

MIMO is a technology that uses multiple antennas to coherently resolve more information than possible using a single antenna. One way it provides this is through spatial division multiplexing (SDM), which spatially multiplexes multiple independent data streams, transferred simultaneously within one spectral channel of bandwidth. MIMO SDM can significantly increase data throughput as the number of resolved spatial data streams is increased. Each spatial stream requires a discrete antenna at both the transmitter and the receiver. In addition, MIMO technology requires a separate radio-frequency chain and analog-to-digital converter for each antenna, making it more expensive to implement than non-MIMO systems.

Channels operating with a width of 40 MHz are another feature incorporated into 802.11n; this doubles the channel width from 20 MHz in previous 802.11 PHYs to transmit data, and provides twice the PHY data rate available over a single 20 MHz channel. It can be enabled in the 5 GHz mode, or within the 2.4 GHz mode if there is knowledge that it will not interfere with any other 802.11 or non-802.11 (such as Bluetooth) system using the same frequencies. The MIMO architecture, together with the wider channels, offers increased physical transfer rate over standard 802.11a (5 GHz) and 802.11g (2.4 GHz).

=== Data encoding ===
The transmitter and receiver use precoding and postcoding techniques, respectively, to achieve the capacity of a MIMO link. Precoding includes spatial beamforming and spatial coding, where spatial beamforming improves the received signal quality at the decoding stage. Spatial coding can increase data throughput via spatial multiplexing and increase range by exploiting the spatial diversity, through techniques such as Alamouti coding.

=== Numbers of antennas and data streams ===
The number of simultaneous data streams is limited by the minimum number of antennas in use on both sides of the link. However, the individual radios often further limit the number of spatial streams that may carry unique data. The a × b : c notation helps identify what a given radio is capable of. The first number (a) is the maximum number of transmit antennas or transmitting TF chains that can be used by the radio. The second number (b) is the maximum number of receive antennas or receiving RF chains that can be used by the radio. The third number (c) is the maximum number of data spatial streams the radio can use. For example, a radio that can transmit on two antennas and receive on three, but can only send or receive two data streams, would be 2 × 3 : 2.

The 802.11n draft allows up to 4 × 4 : 4. Common configurations of 11n devices are 2 × 2 : 2, 2 × 3 : 2, and 3 × 2 : 2. All three configurations have the same maximum throughputs and features, and differ only in the amount of diversity the antenna systems provide. In addition, a fourth configuration, 3 × 3 : 3 is becoming common, which has a higher throughput, due to the additional data stream.

=== Data rates ===
Assuming equal operating parameters to an 802.11g network achieving 54 megabits per second (on a single 20 MHz channel with one antenna), an 802.11n network can achieve 72 megabits per second (on a single 20 MHz channel with one antenna and 400 ns guard interval); 802.11n's speed may go up to 150 megabits per second if there are not other Bluetooth, microwave or Wi-Fi emissions in the neighborhood by using two 20 MHz channels in 40 MHz mode. If more antennas are used, then 802.11n can go up to 288 megabits per second in 20 MHz mode with four antennas, or 600 megabits per second in 40 MHz mode with four antennas and 400 ns guard interval. Because the 2.4 GHz band is seriously congested in most urban areas, 802.11n networks usually have more success in increasing data rate by utilizing more antennas in 20 MHz mode rather than by operating in the 40 MHz mode, as the 40 MHz mode requires a relatively free radio spectrum which is only available in rural areas away from cities. Thus, network engineers installing an 802.11n network should strive to select routers and wireless clients with the most antennas possible (one, two, three or four as specified by the 802.11n standard) and try to make sure that the network's bandwidth will be satisfactory even on the 20 MHz mode.

Data rates up to 600 Mbit/s are achieved only with the maximum of four spatial streams using one 40 MHz-wide channel. Various modulation schemes and coding rates are defined by the standard, which also assigns an arbitrary number to each; this number is the modulation and coding scheme index, or MCS index. The table below shows the relationships between the variables that allow for the maximum data rate. GI (Guard Interval): Timing between symbols.

20 MHz channel uses an FFT of 64, of which: 56 OFDM subcarriers, 52 are for data and 4 are pilot tones with a carrier separation of 0.3125 MHz (20 MHz/64) (3.2 μs). Each of these subcarriers can be a BPSK, QPSK, 16-QAM or 64-QAM. The total bandwidth is 20 MHz with an occupied bandwidth of 17.8 MHz. Total symbol duration is 3.6 or 4 microseconds, which includes a guard interval of 0.4 (also known as short guard interval (SGI)) or 0.8 microseconds.

Modulation and coding schemes
MCS index	Spatial streams	Modulation type	Coding rate	Data rate (Mbit/s) (Note: Per spatial stream.)			
MCS index	Spatial streams	Modulation type	Coding rate	20 MHz channel		40 MHz channel	
MCS index	Spatial streams	Modulation type	Coding rate	800 ns GI	400 ns GI	800 ns GI	400 ns GI
0	1	BPSK	1/2	6.5	7.2	13.5	15
1	1	QPSK	1/2	13	14.4	27	30
2	1	QPSK	3/4	19.5	21.7	40.5	45
3	1	16-QAM	1/2	26	28.9	54	60
4	1	16-QAM	3/4	39	43.3	81	90
5	1	64-QAM	2/3	52	57.8	108	120
6	1	64-QAM	3/4	58.5	65	121.5	135
7	1	64-QAM	5/6	65	72.2	135	150
8	2	BPSK	1/2	13	14.4	27	30
9	2	QPSK	1/2	26	28.9	54	60
10	2	QPSK	3/4	39	43.3	81	90
11	2	16-QAM	1/2	52	57.8	108	120
12	2	16-QAM	3/4	78	86.7	162	180
13	2	64-QAM	2/3	104	115.6	216	240
14	2	64-QAM	3/4	117	130	243	270
15	2	64-QAM	5/6	130	144.4	270	300
16	3	BPSK	1/2	19.5	21.7	40.5	45
17	3	QPSK	1/2	39	43.3	81	90
18	3	QPSK	3/4	58.5	65	121.5	135
19	3	16-QAM	1/2	78	86.7	162	180
20	3	16-QAM	3/4	117	130	243	270
21	3	64-QAM	2/3	156	173.3	324	360
22	3	64-QAM	3/4	175.5	195	364.5	405
23	3	64-QAM	5/6	195	216.7	405	450
24	4	BPSK	1/2	26	28.8	54	60
25	4	QPSK	1/2	52	57.6	108	120
26	4	QPSK	3/4	78	86.8	162	180
27	4	16-QAM	1/2	104	115.6	216	240
28	4	16-QAM	3/4	156	173.2	324	360
29	4	64-QAM	2/3	208	231.2	432	480
30	4	64-QAM	3/4	234	260	486	540
31	4	64-QAM	5/6	260	288.8	540	600
32	1	BPSK	1/4	—N/a	—N/a	6.0	6.7
33 – 38	2	Asymmetric mod.		Depends	Depends	Depends	Depends
39 – 52	3	Asymmetric mod.		Depends	Depends	Depends	Depends
53 – 76	4	Asymmetric mod.		Depends	Depends	Depends	Depends
77 – 127		Reserved		—N/a	—N/a	—N/a	—N/a

=== Frame aggregation ===
PHY level data rate does not match user level throughput because of 802.11 protocol overheads, like the contention process, interframe spacing, PHY level headers (Preamble + PLCP) and acknowledgment frames. The main media access control (MAC) feature that provides a performance improvement is aggregation. Two types of aggregation are defined:

1. Aggregation of MAC service data units (MSDUs) at the top of the MAC (referred to as MSDU aggregation or A-MSDU)
2. Aggregation of MAC protocol data units (MPDUs) at the bottom of the MAC (referred to as MPDU aggregation or A-MPDU)

Frame aggregation is a process of packing multiple MSDUs or MPDUs together to reduce the overheads and average them over multiple frames, thereby increasing the user level data rate. A-MPDU aggregation requires the use of block acknowledgement or BlockAck, which was introduced in 802.11e and has been optimized in 802.11n.

=== Backward compatibility ===
When 802.11g was released to share the band with existing 802.11b devices, it provided ways of ensuring backward compatibility between legacy and successor devices. 802.11n extends the coexistence management to protect its transmissions from legacy devices, which include 802.11g, 802.11b and 802.11a. There are MAC and PHY level protection mechanisms as listed below:

1. PHY level protection: Mixed Mode Format protection (also known as L-SIG TXOP Protection): In mixed mode, each 802.11n transmission is always embedded in an 802.11a or 802.11g transmission. For 20 MHz transmissions, this embedding takes care of the protection with 802.11a and 802.11g. However, 802.11b devices still need CTS protection.
2. PHY level protection: Transmissions using a 40 MHz channel in the presence of 802.11a or 802.11g clients require using CTS protection on both 20 MHz halves of the 40 MHz channel, to prevent interference with legacy devices.
3. MAC level protection: An RTS/CTS frame exchange or CTS frame transmission at legacy rates can be used to protect subsequent 11n transmission.

== Deployment strategies ==
To achieve maximum output, a pure 802.11n 5 GHz network is recommended. The 5 GHz band has substantial capacity due to many non-overlapping radio channels and less radio interference as compared to the 2.4 GHz band. An 802.11n-only network may be impractical for many users because they need to support legacy equipment that still is 802.11b/g only. In a mixed-mode system, an optimal solution would be to use a dual-radio access point and place the 802.11b/g traffic on the 2.4 GHz radio and the 802.11n traffic on the 5 GHz radio. This setup assumes that all the 802.11n clients are 5 GHz capable, which is not a requirement of the standard. 5 GHz is optional on Wi-Fi 4; quite some Wi-Fi 4 capable devices only support 2.4 GHz and there is no practical way to upgrade them to support 5 GHz.

=== Band steering ===
Some enterprise-grade APs use band steering to send 802.11n clients to the 5 GHz band, leaving the 2.4 GHz band for legacy clients. Band steering works by responding only to 5 GHz association requests and not the 2.4 GHz requests from dual-band clients.

=== 40 MHz channels in 2.4 GHz ===
The 2.4 GHz ISM band is fairly congested. With 802.11n, there is the option to double the bandwidth per channel to 40 MHz (fat channel) which results in slightly more than double the data rate. However, in North America, when in 2.4 GHz, enabling this option takes up to 82% of the unlicensed band. For example, channel 3 SCA (secondary channel above), also known as 3+7, reserves the first 9 out of the 11 channels available. In Europe and other places where channels 1–13 are available, allocating 1+5 uses slightly more than 50% of the channels, but the overlap with 9+13 is not usually significant as it lies at the edges of the bands, and so two 40 MHz bands typically work unless the transmitters are physically very closely spaced.

The specification calls for requiring one primary 20 MHz channel as well as a secondary adjacent channel spaced ±20 MHz away. The primary channel is used for communications with clients incapable of 40 MHz mode. When in 40 MHz mode, the center frequency is actually the mean of the primary and secondary channels.

Primary channel	20 MHz	40 MHz above			40 MHz below		
Primary channel	Blocks	2nd ch.	Center	Blocks	2nd ch.	Center	Blocks
1	1–3	5	3	1–7	—N/a		
2	1–4	6	4	1–8	—N/a		
3	1–5	7	5	1–9	—N/a		
4	2–6	8	6	2–10	—N/a		
5	3–7	9	7	3–11	1	3	1–7
6	4–8	10	8	4–12	2	4	1–8
7	5–9	11	9	5–13	3	5	1–9
8	6–10	12	10	6–13	4	6	2–10
9	7–11	13	11	7–13	5	7	3–11
10	8–12	—N/a			6	8	4–12
11	9–13	—N/a			7	9	5–13
12	10–13	—N/a			8	10	6–13
13	11–13	—N/a			9	11	7–13

Local regulations may restrict certain channels from operation. For example, Channels 12 and 13 are normally unavailable for use as either a primary or secondary channel in North America. For further information, see List of WLAN channels.

== Wi-Fi Alliance certification program ==
The Wi-Fi Alliance has upgraded its suite of compatibility tests for some enhancements that were finalized after a 2.0. Furthermore, it has affirmed that all draft-n certified products remain compatible with the products conforming to the final standards.

=== draft-n ===
After the first draft of the IEEE 802.11n standard was published in 2006, many manufacturers began producing so-called "draft-n" products that claimed to comply with the standard draft, even before standard finalization which mean they might not be inter-operational with products produced according to IEEE 802.11 standard after the standard publication, nor even among themselves. The Wi-Fi Alliance began certifying products based on IEEE 802.11n draft 2.0 mid-2007. This certification program established a set of features and a level of interoperability across vendors supporting those features, thus providing one definition of "draft n" to ensure compatibility and interoperability. The baseline certification covers both 20 MHz and 40 MHz wide channels, and up to two spatial streams, for maximum throughputs of 144.4 Mbit/s for 20 MHz and 300 Mbit/s for 40 MHz (with short guard interval). A number of vendors in both the consumer and enterprise spaces have built products that have achieved this certification.

== Timeline ==
The following are milestones in the development of 802.11n:

September 11, 2002
The first meeting of the High-Throughput Study Group (HTSG) was held. Earlier in the year, in the Wireless Next Generation standing committee (WNG SC), presentations were heard on why they need change and what the target throughput would be required to justify the amendments. Compromise was reached in May 2002 to delay the start of the Study Group until September to allow 11g to complete major work during the July 2002 session.

September 11, 2003
The IEEE-SA New Standards Committee (NesCom) approved the Project Authorization Request (PAR) for the purpose of amending the 802.11-2007 standard. The new 802.11 Task Group (TGn) is to develop a new amendment. The TGn amendment is based on IEEE Std 802.11-2007, as amended by IEEE Std 802.11k-2008, IEEE Std 802.11r-2008, IEEE Std 802.11y-2008 and IEEE P802.11w. TGn will be the 5th amendment to the 802.11-2007 standard. The scope of this project is to define an amendment that shall define standardized modifications to both the 802.11 physical layers (PHY) and the 802.11 Medium Access Control Layer (MAC) so that modes of operation can be enabled that are capable of much higher throughputs, with a maximum throughput of at least 100 Mbit/s, as measured at the MAC data service access point (SAP).

September 15, 2003
The first meeting of the new 802.11 Task Group (TGn).

May 17, 2004
Call for Proposals was issued.

September 13, 2004
32 first round of proposals were heard.

March 2005
Proposals were downselected to a single proposal, but there is not a 75% consensus on the one proposal. Further efforts were expended over the next 3 sessions without being able to agree on one proposal.

July 2005
Previous competitors TGn Sync, WWiSE, and a third group, MITMOT, said that they would merge their respective proposals as a draft. The standardization process was expected to be completed by the second quarter of 2009.

January 19, 2006
The IEEE 802.11n Task Group approved the Joint Proposal's specification, enhanced by EWC's draft specification.

March 2006
IEEE 802.11 Working Group sent the 802.11n draft to its first letter ballot, allowing the 500+ 802.11 voters to review the document and suggest bug fixes, changes, and improvements.

May 2, 2006
The IEEE 802.11 Working Group voted not to forward draft 1.0 of the proposed 802.11n standard. Only 46.6% voted to approve the ballot. To proceed to the next step in the IEEE standards process, a majority vote of 75% is required. This letter ballot also generated approximately 12,000 comments—many more than anticipated.

November 2006
TGn voted to accept draft version 1.06, incorporating all accepted technical and editorial comment resolutions prior to this meeting. An additional 800 comment resolutions were approved during the November session which will be incorporated into the next revision of the draft. As of this meeting, three of the 18 comment topic ad hoc groups chartered in May had completed their work, and 88% of the technical comments had been resolved, with approximately 370 remaining.

January 19, 2007
The IEEE 802.11 Working Group unanimously (100 yes, 0 no, 5 abstaining) approved a request by the 802.11n Task Group to issue a new draft 2.0 of the proposed standard. Draft 2.0 was based on the Task Group's working draft version 1.10. Draft 2.0 was at this point in time the cumulative result of thousands of changes to the 11n document as based on all previous comments.

February 7, 2007
The results of Letter Ballot 95, a 15-day Procedural vote, passed with 97.99% approval and 2.01% disapproval. On the same day, 802.11 Working Group announced the opening of Letter Ballot 97. It invited detailed technical comments to closed on 9 March 2007.

March 9, 2007
Letter Ballot 97, the 30-day Technical vote to approve draft 2.0, closed. They were announced by IEEE 802 leadership during the Orlando Plenary on 12 March 2007. The ballot passed with an 83.4% approval, above the 75% minimum approval threshold. There were still approximately 3,076 unique comments, which were to be individually examined for incorporation into the next revision of draft 2.

June 25, 2007
The Wi-Fi Alliance announced its official certification program for devices based on draft 2.0.

September 7, 2007
Task Group agreed on all outstanding issues for draft 2.07. Draft 3.0 is authorized, with the expectation that it go to a sponsor ballot in November 2007.

November 2007
Draft 3.0 approved (240 voted affirmative, 43 negative, and 27 abstained). The editor was authorized to produce draft 3.01.

January 2008
Draft 3.02 approved. This version incorporates previously approved technical and editorial comments. There remain 127 unresolved technical comments. It was expected that all remaining comments will be resolved and that TGn and WG11 would subsequently release draft 4.0 for working group recirculation ballot following the March meeting.

May 2008
Draft 4.0 approved.

July 2008
Draft 5.0 approved and anticipated publication timeline modified.

September 2008
Draft 6.0 approved.

November 2008
Draft 7.0 approved.

January 2009
Draft 7.0 forwarded to sponsor ballot; the sponsor ballot was approved (158 for, 45 against, 21 abstaining); 241 comments were received.

March 2009
Draft 8.0 proceeded to sponsor ballot recirculation; the ballot passed by an 80.1% majority (75% required) (228 votes received, 169 approve, 42 not approve); 277 members are in the sponsor ballot pool; The comment resolution committee resolved the 77 comments received, and authorized the editor to create a draft 9.0 for further balloting.

April 4, 2009
Draft 9.0 passed sponsor ballot recirculation; the ballot passed by an 80.7% majority (75% required) (233 votes received, 171 approve, 41 not approve); 277 members are in the sponsor ballot pool; The comment resolution committee is resolving the 23 new comments received, and will authorize the editor to create a new draft for further balloting.

May 15, 2009
Draft 10.0 passed sponsor ballot recirculation.

June 23, 2009
Draft 11.0 passed sponsor ballot recirculation.

July 17, 2009
Final WG Approval passed with 53 approve, 1 against, 6 abstain. Unanimous approval to send Final WG draft 11.0 to RevCom.

September 11, 2009
RevCom/Standards Board approval.

October 29, 2009
Published.

== Comparison ==
802.11 network standards
Frequency range, or type	PHY	Protocol	Release date	Frequency band	Channel width	Stream data rate	Max. MIMO streams	Modulation	Approx. range	
Frequency range, or type	PHY	Protocol	Release date	Frequency band	Channel width	Stream data rate	Max. MIMO streams	Modulation	Indoor	Outdoor
Frequency range, or type	PHY	Protocol	Release date	(GHz)	(MHz)	(Mbit/s)	Max. MIMO streams	Modulation	Indoor	Outdoor
1–7 GHz	DSSS, ~~FHSS~~ (Note: This is obsolete, and support for this might be subject to removal in a future revision of the standard)	802.11-1997	June 1997	2.4	22	1, 2	—N/a	DSSS, ~~FHSS~~	20 m (66 ft)	100 m (330 ft)
1–7 GHz	HR/DSSS	802.11b	September 1999	2.4	22	1, 2, 5.5, 11	—N/a	CCK, DSSS	35 m (115 ft)	140 m (460 ft)
1–7 GHz	OFDM	802.11a	September 1999	5	5, 10, 20	6, 9, 12, 18, 24, 36, 48, 54 (for 20 MHz bandwidth, divide by 2 and 4 for 10 and 5 MHz)	—N/a	OFDM	35 m (115 ft)	120 m (390 ft)
1–7 GHz	OFDM	802.11j	November 2004	4.9, 5.0 (Note: For Japanese regulation.)	5, 10, 20	6, 9, 12, 18, 24, 36, 48, 54 (for 20 MHz bandwidth, divide by 2 and 4 for 10 and 5 MHz)	—N/a	OFDM	?	?
1–7 GHz	OFDM	802.11y	November 2008	3.7 (Note: IEEE 802.11y-2008 extended operation of 802.11a to the licensed 3.7 GHz band. Increased power limits allow a range up to 5,000 m. As of 2009, it is only being licensed in the United States by the FCC.)	5, 10, 20	6, 9, 12, 18, 24, 36, 48, 54 (for 20 MHz bandwidth, divide by 2 and 4 for 10 and 5 MHz)	—N/a	OFDM	?	5,000 m (16,000 ft)
1–7 GHz	OFDM	802.11p	July 2010	5.9	5, 10, 20	6, 9, 12, 18, 24, 36, 48, 54 (for 20 MHz bandwidth, divide by 2 and 4 for 10 and 5 MHz)	—N/a	OFDM	200 m	1,000 m (3,300 ft)
1–7 GHz	OFDM	802.11bd	December 2022	5.9, 60	5, 10, 20	6, 9, 12, 18, 24, 36, 48, 54 (for 20 MHz bandwidth, divide by 2 and 4 for 10 and 5 MHz)	—N/a	OFDM	500 m	1,000 m (3,300 ft)
1–7 GHz	ERP-OFDM	802.11g	June 2003	2.4	5, 10, 20	6, 9, 12, 18, 24, 36, 48, 54 (for 20 MHz bandwidth, divide by 2 and 4 for 10 and 5 MHz)	—N/a	OFDM	38 m (125 ft)	140 m (460 ft)
1–7 GHz	HT-OFDM	802.11n (Wi-Fi 4)	October 2009	2.4, 5	20	Up to 288.8 (Note: Based on short guard interval; standard guard interval is ~10% slower. Rates vary widely based on distance, obstructions, and interference.)	4	MIMO-OFDM (64-QAM)	70 m (230 ft)	250 m (820 ft)
1–7 GHz	HT-OFDM	802.11n (Wi-Fi 4)	October 2009	2.4, 5	40	Up to 600	4	MIMO-OFDM (64-QAM)	70 m (230 ft)	250 m (820 ft)
1–7 GHz	VHT-OFDM	802.11ac (Wi-Fi 5)	December 2013	5	20	Up to 693	8	DL; MU-MIMO OFDM (256-QAM)	35 m (115 ft)	?
1–7 GHz	VHT-OFDM	802.11ac (Wi-Fi 5)	December 2013	5	40	Up to 1,600	8	DL; MU-MIMO OFDM (256-QAM)	35 m (115 ft)	?
1–7 GHz	VHT-OFDM	802.11ac (Wi-Fi 5)	December 2013	5	80	Up to 3,467	8	DL; MU-MIMO OFDM (256-QAM)	35 m (115 ft)	?
1–7 GHz	VHT-OFDM	802.11ac (Wi-Fi 5)	December 2013	5	160	Up to 6,933	8	DL; MU-MIMO OFDM (256-QAM)	35 m (115 ft)	?
1–7 GHz	HE-OFDMA	802.11ax (Wi-Fi 6, Wi-Fi 6E)	May 2021	2.4, 5, 6	20	Up to 1,147 (Note: For single-user cases only, based on default guard interval which is 0.8 microseconds. Since multi-user via OFDMA has become available for 802.11ax, these may decrease. Also, these theoretical values depend on the link distance, whether the link is line-of-sight or not, interferences and the multi-path components in the environment.)	8	UL/DL; MU-MIMO OFDMA (1024-QAM)	30 m (98 ft)	120 m (390 ft) (Note: The default guard interval is 0.8 microseconds. However, 802.11ax extended the maximum available guard interval to 3.2 microseconds, in order to support outdoor communications, where the maximum possible propagation delay is larger compared to Indoor environments.)
1–7 GHz	HE-OFDMA	802.11ax (Wi-Fi 6, Wi-Fi 6E)	May 2021	2.4, 5, 6	40	Up to 2,294	8	UL/DL; MU-MIMO OFDMA (1024-QAM)	30 m (98 ft)	120 m (390 ft)
1–7 GHz	HE-OFDMA	802.11ax (Wi-Fi 6, Wi-Fi 6E)	May 2021	2.4, 5, 6	80	Up to 5,500	8	UL/DL; MU-MIMO OFDMA (1024-QAM)	30 m (98 ft)	120 m (390 ft)
1–7 GHz	HE-OFDMA	802.11ax (Wi-Fi 6, Wi-Fi 6E)	May 2021	2.4, 5, 6	80+80	Up to 11,000	8	UL/DL; MU-MIMO OFDMA (1024-QAM)	30 m (98 ft)	120 m (390 ft)
1–7 GHz	EHT-OFDMA	802.11be (Wi-Fi 7)	Sep 2024	2.4, 5, 6	80	Up to 5,764	8	UL/DL; MU-MIMO OFDMA (4096-QAM)	30 m (98 ft)	120 m (390 ft)
1–7 GHz	EHT-OFDMA	802.11be (Wi-Fi 7)	Sep 2024	2.4, 5, 6	160 (80+80)	Up to 11,500	8	UL/DL; MU-MIMO OFDMA (4096-QAM)	30 m (98 ft)	120 m (390 ft)
1–7 GHz	EHT-OFDMA	802.11be (Wi-Fi 7)	Sep 2024	2.4, 5, 6	240 (160+80)	Up to 14,282	8	UL/DL; MU-MIMO OFDMA (4096-QAM)	30 m (98 ft)	120 m (390 ft)
1–7 GHz	EHT-OFDMA	802.11be (Wi-Fi 7)	Sep 2024	2.4, 5, 6	320 (160+160)	Up to 23,059	8	UL/DL; MU-MIMO OFDMA (4096-QAM)	30 m (98 ft)	120 m (390 ft)
1–7 GHz	UHR	802.11bn (Wi-Fi 8)	May 2028 (est.)	2.4, 5, 6	320	Up to 23,059	8	Multi-link; MU-MIMO OFDM (4096-QAM)	?	?
1–7 GHz	WUR (Note: Wake-up Radio (WUR) Operation.)	802.11ba	October 2021	2.4, 5	4, 20	0.0625, 0.25 (62.5 kbit/s, 250 kbit/s)	—N/a	OOK (multi-carrier OOK)	?	?
mmWave (WiGig)	DMG	802.11ad	December 2012	60	2,160 (2.16 GHz)	Up to 8,085 (8 Gbit/s)	—N/a	~~OFDM~~, single carrier, low-power single carrier	3.3 m (11 ft)	?
mmWave (WiGig)	DMG	802.11aj	April 2018	60 (Note: For Chinese regulation.)	1,080	Up to 3,754 (3.75 Gbit/s)	—N/a	single carrier, low-power single carrier	?	?
mmWave (WiGig)	CMMG	802.11aj	April 2018	45	540, 1,080	Up to 15,015 (15 Gbit/s)	4	OFDM, single carrier	?	?
mmWave (WiGig)	EDMG	802.11ay	July 2021	60	Up to 8,640 (8.64 GHz)	Up to 303,336 (303 Gbit/s)	8	OFDM, single carrier	10 m (33 ft)	100 m (328 ft)
Sub 1 GHz (IoT)	TVHT	802.11af	February 2014	0.054– 0.79	6, 7, 8	Up to 568.9	4	MIMO-OFDM	?	?
Sub 1 GHz (IoT)	S1G	802.11ah	May 2017	0.7, 0.8, 0.9	1–16	Up to 8.67 (@2 MHz)	4	MIMO-OFDM	?	?
Light (Li-Fi)	LC (VLC/OWC)	802.11bb	November 2023	800–1000 nm	20	Up to 9.6 Gbit/s	—N/a	O-OFDM	?	?
Light (Li-Fi)	~~IR~~ (IrDA)	802.11-1997	June 1997	850–900 nm	?	1, 2	—N/a	~~PPM~~	?	?
802.11 Standard rollups
		802.11-2007 (802.11ma)	March 2007	2.4, 5		Up to 54		DSSS, OFDM		
		802.11-2012 (802.11mb)	March 2012	2.4, 5		Up to 150		DSSS, OFDM		
		802.11-2016 (802.11mc)	December 2016	2.4, 5, 60		Up to 866.7 or 6,757		DSSS, OFDM		
		802.11-2020 (802.11md)	December 2020	2.4, 5, 60		Up to 866.7 or 6,757		DSSS, OFDM		
		802.11-2024 (802.11me)	September 2024	2.4, 5, 6, 60		Up to 9,608 or 303,336		DSSS, OFDM		

== See also ==
- List of WLAN channels
- Spectral efficiency comparison table
- WiMAX MIMO

== Standard ==
- IEEE 802.11n-2009—Amendment 5: Enhancements for Higher Throughput. IEEE-SA. 29 October 2009. doi:10.1109/IEEESTD.2009.5307322. ISBN 978-0-7381-6046-7.
- IEEE 802.11n-2009
