= Wi-Fi Protected Setup =

Network security standard to create a secure wireless home network

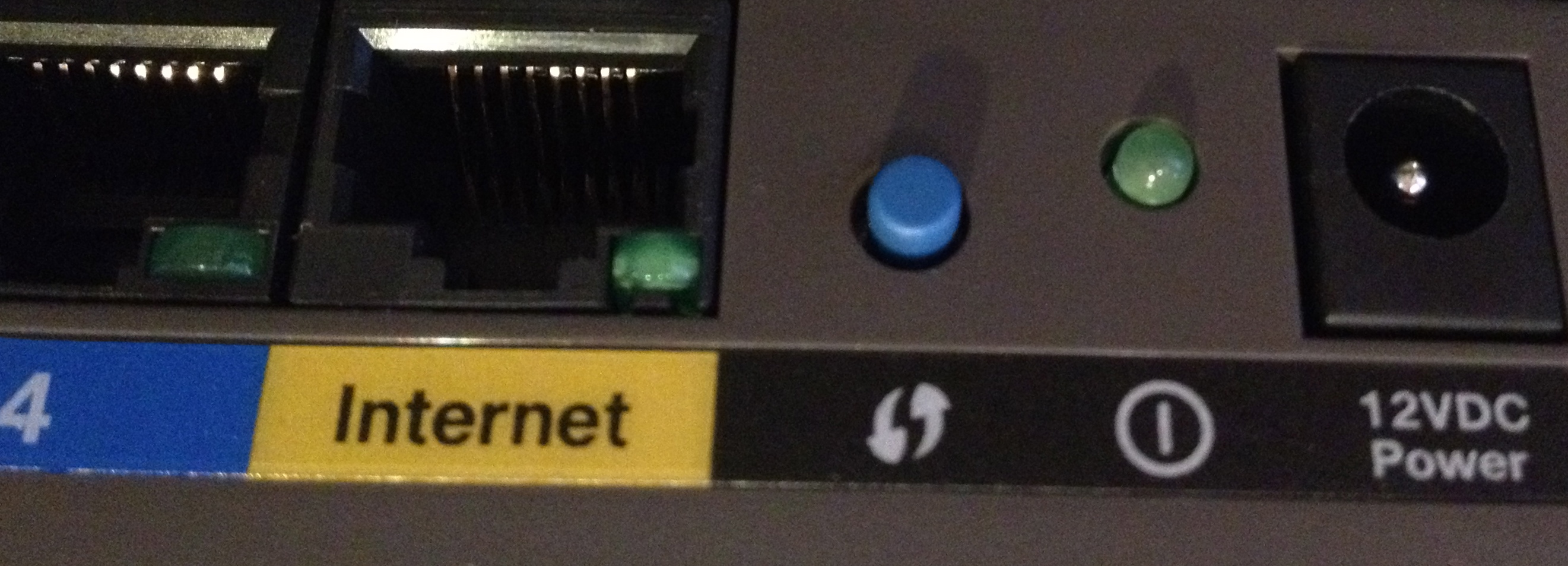
The WPS push button (center, blue) on a wireless router showing the symbol defined by the Wi‑Fi Alliance for this function.

Wi‑Fi Protected Setup (WPS), referred to as Wi‑Fi Simple Configuration in the specification, and branded as WPS, is a standard designed to ease the setup of Wi‑Fi networks in home and small office environments.

Created by Wi‑Fi Alliance, the purpose of the protocol is to allow home users who know little of wireless security and may be intimidated by the available security options to set up Wi‑Fi Protected Access, as well as making it easy to add new devices to an existing network without entering long passphrases. It is used by devices made by HP, Brother, and Canon, especially for their printers. WPS is a wireless method that is used to connect certain Wi‑Fi devices, such as printers and security cameras, to the Wi‑Fi network without using any password. In addition, another way to connect is called WPS PIN; this is used by some devices to connect to the wireless network.

A major security flaw was revealed in December 2011 that affects wireless routers with the WPS PIN feature, which most recent models have enabled by default. The flaw allows a remote attacker to recover the WPS PIN in 4–10 hours with a brute-force attack and, with the WPS PIN, the network's WPA/WPA2 pre-shared key (PSK). Users have been urged to turn off the WPS PIN feature, although this may not be possible on some router models.

== Modes ==
The standard emphasizes usability and security, and allows four modes in a home network for adding a new device to the network:

PIN method
In which a PIN has to be read from either a sticker or display on the new wireless device. This PIN must then be entered at the "representant" of the network, usually the network's access point. Alternately, a PIN provided by the access point may be entered into the new device. This method is the mandatory baseline mode and everything must support it. The Wi‑Fi Direct specification supersedes this requirement by stating that all devices with a keypad or display must support the PIN method.
Push button method
In which the user has to push a button, either an actual or virtual one, on both the access point and the new wireless client device. On most devices, this discovery mode turns itself off as soon as a connection is established or after a delay (typically 2 minutes or less), whichever comes first, thereby minimizing its vulnerability. Support of this mode is mandatory for access points and optional for connecting devices. The Wi‑Fi Direct specification supersedes this requirement by stating that all devices must support the push button method.
Near-field communication method
In which the user has to bring the new client close to the access point to allow a near-field communication between the devices. NFC Forum–compliant RFID tags can also be used. Support of this mode is optional.
USB method
In which the user uses a USB flash drive to transfer data between the new client device and the network's access point. Support of this mode is optional, but deprecated.

The last two modes are usually referred to as out-of-band methods as there is a transfer of information by a channel other than the Wi‑Fi channel itself. Only the first two modes are currently covered by the WPS certification. The USB method has been deprecated and is not part of the Alliance's certification testing.

Some wireless access points have a dual-function WPS button, and holding this button down for a shorter or longer time may have other functions, such as factory-reset or toggling WiFi.

Some manufacturers, such as Netgear, use a different logo and/or name for Wi‑Fi Protected Setup; the Wi‑Fi Alliance recommends the use of the Wi‑Fi Protected Setup Identifier Mark on the hardware button for this function.

== Technical architecture ==
The WPS protocol defines three types of devices in a network:

Registrar
A device with the authority to issue and revoke access to a network; it may be integrated into a wireless access point (AP), or provided as a separate device.
Enrollee
A client device seeking to join a wireless network.
AP
An access point functioning as a proxy between a registrar and an enrollee.

The WPS standard defines three basic scenarios that involve components listed above:

AP with integrated registrar capabilities configures an enrollee station (STA)
In this case, the session will run on the wireless medium as a series of EAP request/response messages, ending with the AP disassociating from the STA and waiting for the STA to reconnect with its new configuration (handed to it by the AP just before).
Registrar STA configures the AP as an enrollee
This case is subdivided in two aspects: first, the session could occur on either a wired or wireless medium, and second, the AP could already be configured by the time the registrar found it. In the case of a wired connection between the devices, the protocol runs over Universal Plug and Play (UPnP), and both devices will have to support UPnP for that purpose. When running over UPnP, a shortened version of the protocol is run (only two messages) as no authentication is required other than that of the joined wired medium. In the case of a wireless medium, the session of the protocol is very similar to the internal registrar scenario, but with opposite roles. As to the configuration state of the AP, the registrar is expected to ask the user whether to reconfigure the AP or keep its current settings, and can decide to reconfigure it even if the AP describes itself as configured. Multiple registrars should have the ability to connect to the AP. UPnP is intended to apply only to a wired medium, while actually it applies to any interface to which an IP connection can be set up. Thus, having manually set up a wireless connection, the UPnP can be used over it in the same manner as with the wired connection.
Registrar STA configures enrollee STA
In this case the AP stands in the middle and acts as an authenticator, meaning it only proxies the relevant messages from side to side.

== Protocol ==
The WPS protocol consists of a series of EAP message exchanges that are triggered by a user action, relying on an exchange of descriptive information that should precede that user's action. The descriptive information is transferred through a new Information Element (IE) that is added to the beacon, probe response, and optionally to the probe request and association request/response messages. Other than purely informative type–length–values, those IEs will also hold the possible and the currently deployed configuration methods of the device.

After this communication of the device capabilities from both ends, the user initiates the actual protocol session. The session consists of eight messages that are followed, in the case of a successful session, by a message to indicate that the protocol is completed. The exact stream of messages may change when configuring different kinds of devices (AP or STA), or when using different physical media (wired or wireless).

== Band or radio selection ==
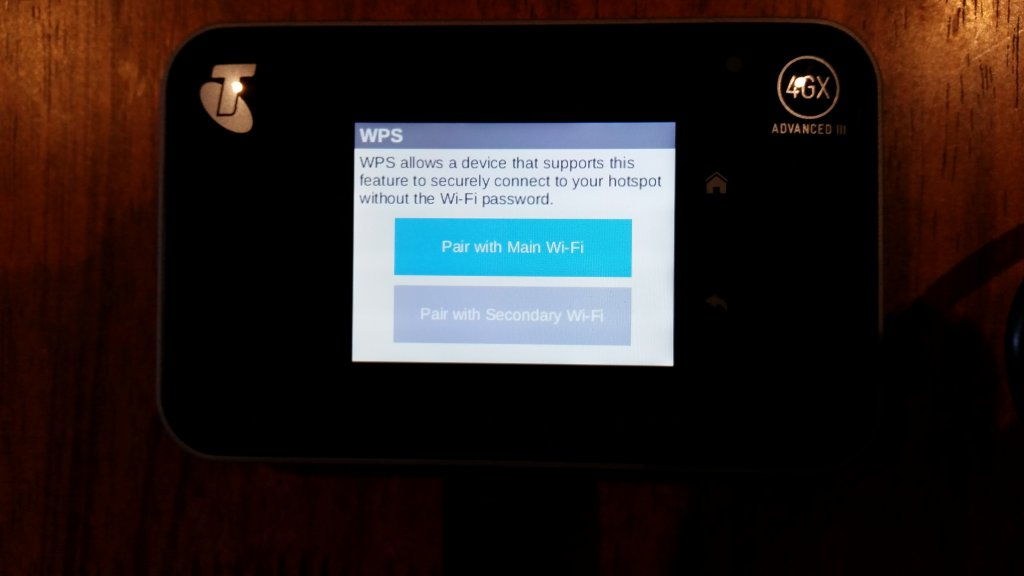
A Telstra 4GX Advanced III mobile broadband device showing WPS pairing options for a particular radio/band.

Some devices with dual-band wireless network connectivity do not allow the user to select the 2.4 GHz or 5 GHz band (or even a particular radio or SSID) when using Wi‑Fi Protected Setup, unless the wireless access point has separate WPS button for each band or radio; however, a number of later wireless routers with multiple frequency bands and/or radios allow the establishment of a WPS session for a specific band and/or radio for connection with clients which cannot have the SSID or band (e.g., 2.4/5 GHz) explicitly selected by the user on the client for connection with WPS (e.g. pushing the 5 GHz, where supported, WPS button on the wireless router will force a client device to connect via WPS on only the 5 GHz band after a WPS session has been established by the client device which cannot explicitly allow the selection of wireless network and/or band for the WPS connection method).

== Security problems ==
=== Online brute-force attack ===
In December 2011, researcher Stefan Viehböck reported a design and implementation flaw that makes brute-force attacks against PIN-based WPS feasible to be performed on WPS-enabled Wi‑Fi networks. A successful attack on WPS allows unauthorized parties to gain access to the network, and the only effective workaround is to disable WPS. The vulnerability centers around the acknowledgement messages sent between the registrar and enrollee when attempting to validate a PIN, which is an eight-digit number used to add new enrollees to the network. Since the last digit is a checksum of the previous digits, there are seven unknown digits in each PIN, yielding 10^{7} = 10,000,000 possible combinations.

When an enrollee attempts to gain access using a PIN, the registrar reports the validity of the first and second halves of the PIN separately. Since the first half of the PIN consists of four digits (10,000 possibilities) and the second half has only three active digits (1000 possibilities), at most 11,000 guesses are needed before the PIN is recovered. This is a reduction by three orders of magnitude from the number of PINs that would be required to be tested. As a result, an attack can be completed in under four hours. The ease or difficulty of exploiting this flaw is implementation-dependent, as Wi‑Fi router manufacturers could defend against such attacks by slowing or disabling the WPS feature after several failed PIN validation attempts.

A young software developer based out of a small town in eastern New Mexico created a tool that exploits this vulnerability to prove that the attack is feasible. The tool was then purchased by Tactical Network Solutions in Maryland. They state that they have known about the vulnerability since early 2011 and had been exploiting it.

In some devices, disabling WPS in the user interface does not result in the feature actually being disabled, and the device remains vulnerable to this attack. Firmware updates have been released for some of these devices allowing WPS to be disabled completely. Vendors could also patch the vulnerability by adding a lock-down period if the Wi‑Fi access point detects a brute-force attack in progress, which disables the PIN method for long enough to make the attack impractical.

=== Offline brute-force attack ===
In the summer of 2014, Dominique Bongard discovered what he called the Pixie Dust attack. This attack works only on the default WPS implementation of several wireless chip makers, including Ralink, MediaTek, Realtek and Broadcom. The attack focuses on a lack of randomization when generating the E-S1 and E-S2 "secret" nonces. Knowing these two nonces, the PIN can be recovered within a couple of minutes. A tool called pixiewps has been developed and a new version of Reaver has been developed to automate the process.

The access point sends two hashes, E-Hash1 and E-Hash2, to the client, proving that it also knows the PIN. E-Hash1 and E-Hash2 are hashes of (E-S1 | PSK1 | PKe | PKr) and (E-S2 | PSK2 | PKe | PKr), respectively. The hashing function is HMAC-SHA-256 and uses the "authkey" that is the key used to hash the data.

Since both the client and access point (enrollee and registrar, respectively) need to prove they know the PIN to make sure the client is not connecting to a rogue access point, the attacker already has two hashes that contain each half of the PIN, and all they need is to brute-force the actual PIN.

=== Physical security issues ===
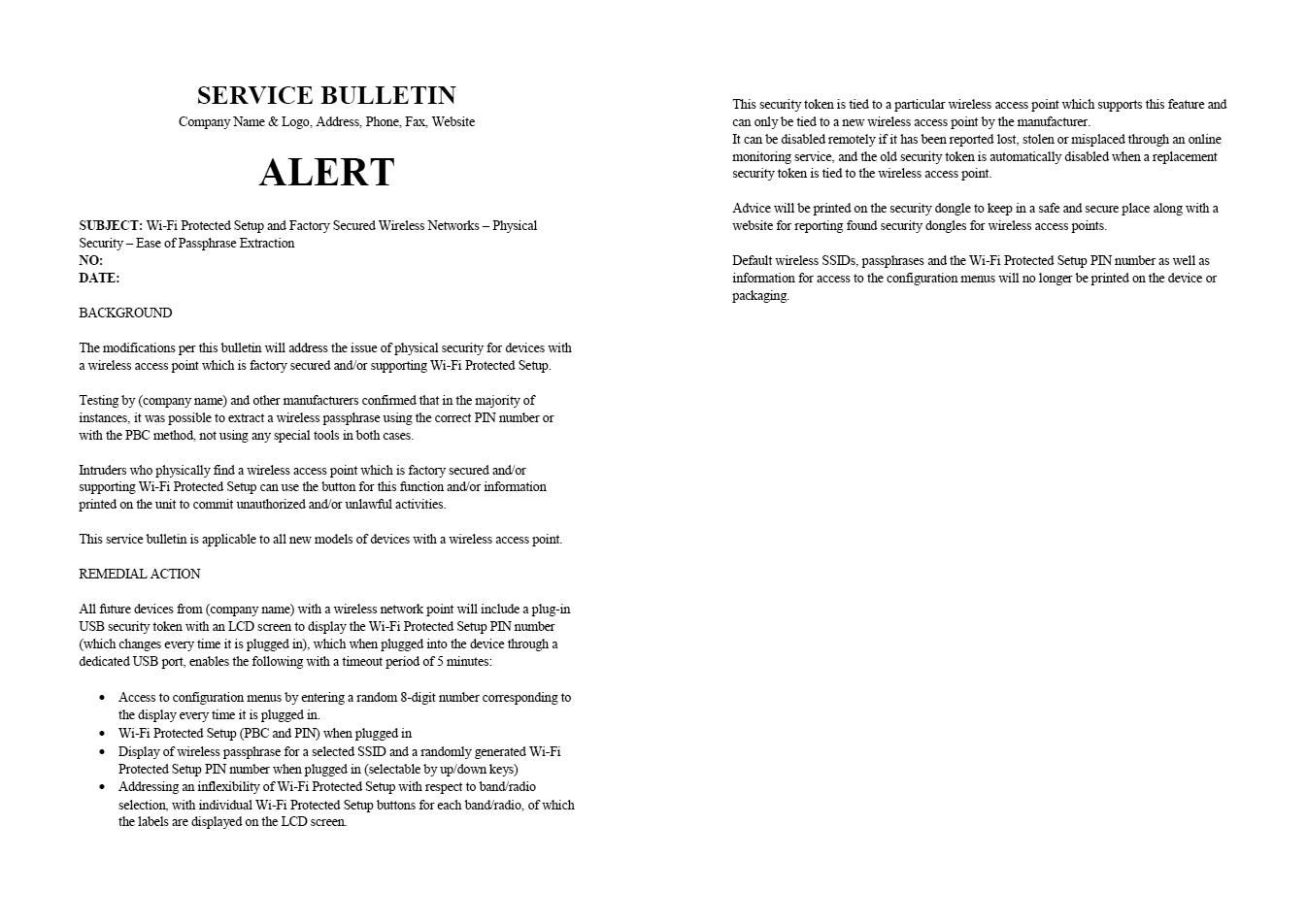
A generic service bulletin regarding physical security for wireless access points

All WPS methods are vulnerable to usage by an unauthorized user if the wireless access point is not kept in a secure area.

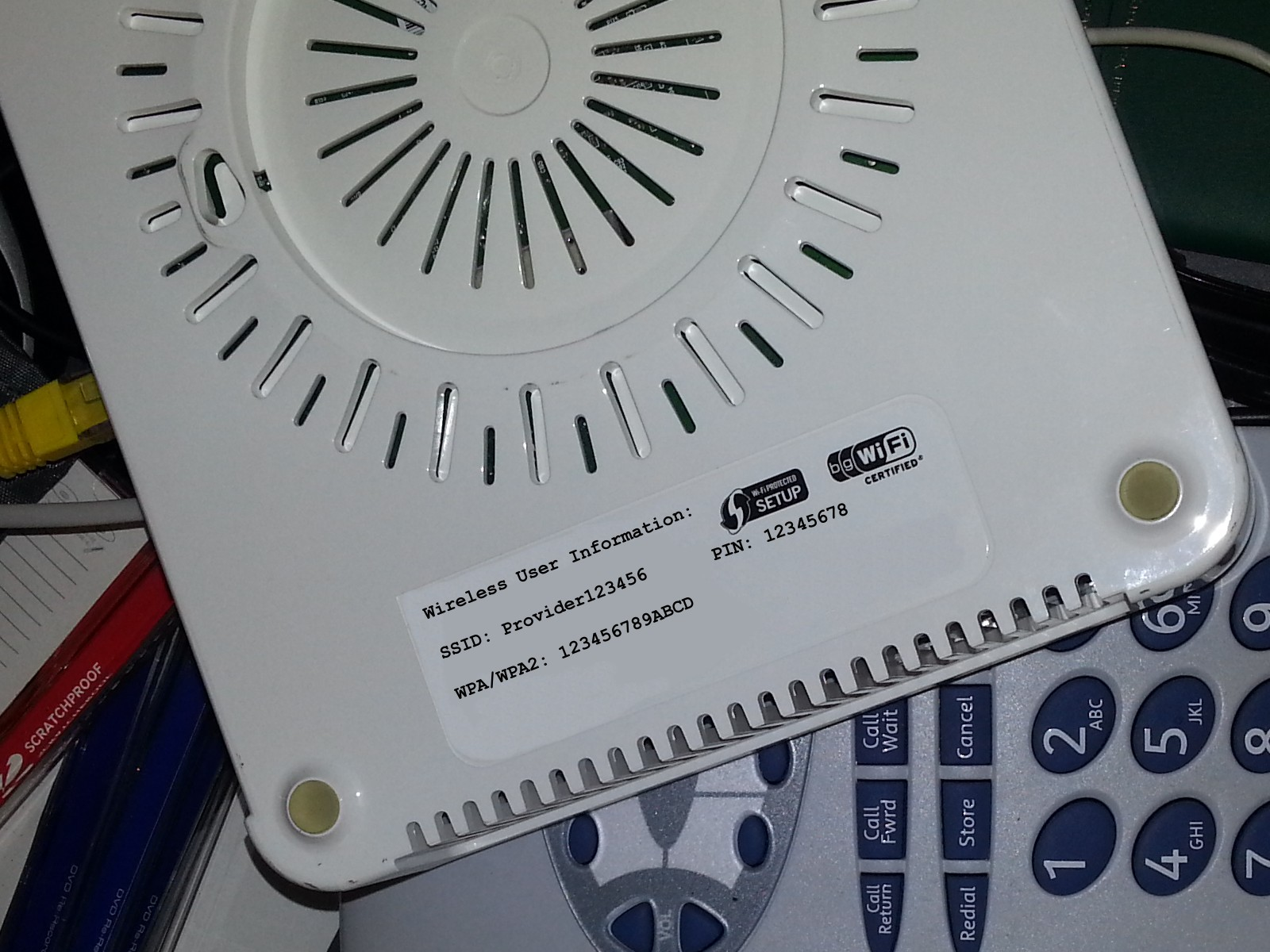
A wireless router showing printed preset security information including the free Wi‑Fi

Many wireless access points have security information (if it is factory-secured) and the WPS PIN printed on them; this PIN is also often found in the configuration menus of the wireless access point. If this PIN cannot be changed or disabled, the only remedy is to get a firmware update to enable the PIN to be changed, or to replace the wireless access point.

It is possible to extract a wireless passphrase with the following methods using no special tools:

- A wireless passphrase can be extracted using WPS under Windows Vista and newer versions of Windows, under administrative privileges by connecting with this method then bringing up the properties for this wireless network and clicking on "show characters".
- Within most Linux desktop and Unix distributions (like Ubuntu), all network connections and their details are visible to a regular user, including the password obtained through WPS. Furthermore, root (aka admin) can always access all network details through terminal, i.e. even if there is no window manager active for regular users.
- A simple exploit in the Intel PROset wireless client utility can reveal the wireless passphrase when WPS is used, after a simple move of the dialog box which asks if you want to reconfigure this access point.

=== WPSplinter ===
In October 2026, Wi-Fi equipment based on a variety of Broadcom chipsets was found to have a vulnerable WPS implementation. The vulnerability was nicknamed WPSplinter and a large number of devices from multiple retail brands and internet service providers are affected. The vulnerability makes it remote code execution possible. It is expected that many of the affected devices will never be patched.
