= Wi-Fi Alliance =

US nonprofit organization that owns the Wi-Fi trademark

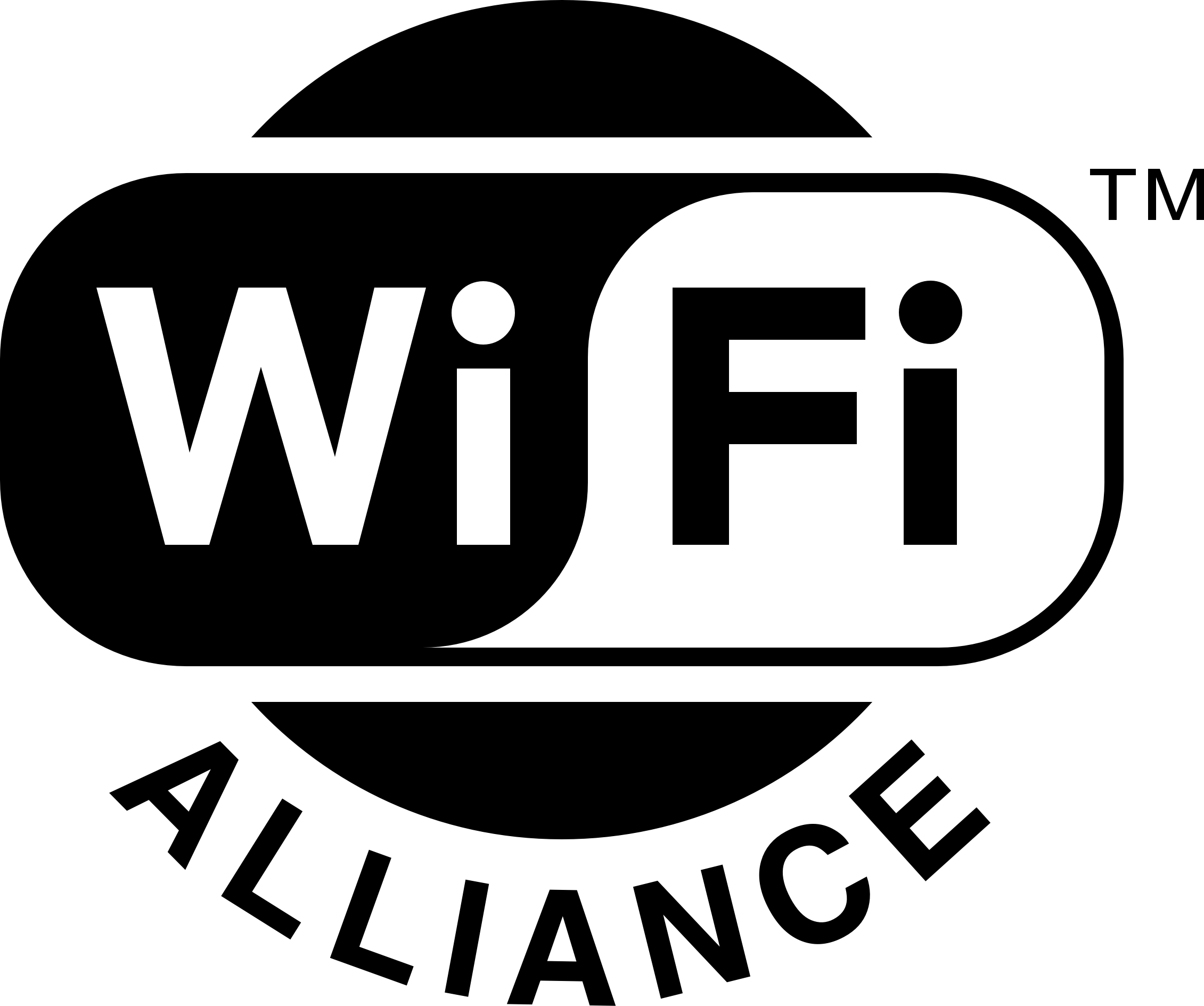
- Formation: 1999; 27 years ago
- Type: Nonprofit
- Headquarters: Austin, Texas, United States
- Region served: Worldwide
- Website: www.wi-fi.org
- Formerly called: Wireless Ethernet Compatibility Alliance

The Wi-Fi Alliance is an American nonprofit organization that owns the Wi-Fi trademark. Manufacturers may use the trademark to brand products certified for Wi-Fi interoperability. It is based in Austin, Texas.

== History ==
Early 802.11 products suffered from interoperability problems because the Institute of Electrical and Electronics Engineers (IEEE) had no provision for testing equipment for compliance with its standards.

In 1999, pioneers of a new, higher-speed variant endorsed the IEEE 802.11b specification to form the Wireless Ethernet Compatibility Alliance (WECA) and branded the new technology Wi-Fi.

The group of companies included 3Com, Aironet (acquired by Cisco), Harris Semiconductor (now Intersil), Lucent Technologies (the WLAN part was renamed as Orinoco, become part of Avaya, then acquired by Extreme Networks), Nokia and Symbol Technologies (acquired by Motorola, Zebra Technologies, and now Extreme Networks).

The alliance lists Apple, Comcast, Samsung, Sony, LG, Intel, Dell, Broadcom, Cisco, Qualcomm, Motorola Mobility, Microsoft, Texas Instruments, and T-Mobile as key sponsors. The charter for this independent organization was to perform testing, certify interoperability of products, and to promote the technology.

WECA renamed itself the Wi-Fi Alliance in 2002.

Most producers of 802.11 equipment became members, and as of 2012, the Wi-Fi Alliance included over 550 member companies. The Wi-Fi Alliance extended Wi-Fi beyond wireless local area network applications into point-to-point and personal area networking and enabled specific applications such as Miracast.

== Wi-Fi certification ==
The Wi-Fi Alliance owns and controls the "Wi-Fi Certified" logo, a registered trademark, which is permitted only on equipment which has passed testing. Purchasers relying on that trademark may have greater chances of interoperation than otherwise. Testing involves not only radio and data format interoperability, but security protocols, as well as optional testing for quality of service and power management protocols. Wi-Fi Certified products have to demonstrate that they can perform well in networks with other Wi-Fi Certified products, running common applications, in situations similar to those encountered in everyday use. Certification employs 3 principles:

- Interoperability is the primary target of certification. Rigorous test cases are used to ensure that products from different equipment vendors can interoperate in a wide variety of configurations.
- Backward compatibility has to be preserved to allow for new equipment to work with existing gear. Backward compatibility protects investments in legacy Wi-Fi products and enables users to gradually upgrade and expand their networks.
- New certification programs allow newer technology and specifications come into the marketplace. These certification programs may be mandatory (e.g., WPA2) or optional (e.g., WMM).

The Wi-Fi Alliance definition of interoperability demands that products have to show satisfactory performance levels in typical network configurations and have to support both established and emerging applications. The Wi-Fi Alliance certification process includes three types of tests to ensure interoperability. Wi-Fi Certified products are tested for:

- Compatibility: certified equipment has been tested for connectivity with other certified equipment. Compatibility testing has always been, and still is, the predominant component of interoperability testing, and it is the element that most people associate with "interoperability". It involves tests with multiple devices from different equipment vendors.
- Conformance: the equipment conforms to specific critical elements of the IEEE 802.11 standard. Conformance testing usually involves standalone analysis of individual products and establishes whether the equipment responds to inputs as expected and specified. For example, conformance testing is used to ensure that Wi-Fi equipment protects itself and the network when the equipment detects evidence of network attacks.
- Performance: the equipment meets the performance levels required. Performance tests are not designed to measure and compare performance among products, but simply to verify that the product meets the minimum performance requirements. Specific performance tests results are not released by the Wi-Fi Alliance.

=== Certification types ===
The Wi-Fi Alliance provides certification testing in two levels:

Mandatory:

- Core MAC/PHY interoperability over 802.11a, 802.11b, 802.11g, and 802.11n (at least one).
- Wi-Fi Protected Access 2 (WPA2) security, which aligns with IEEE 802.11i. WPA2 is available in two types: WPA2-Personal for consumer use, and WPA2 Enterprise, which adds EAP authentication.

Optional:

- Tests corresponding to IEEE 802.11h and 802.11d.
- WMM Quality of Service, based upon a subset of IEEE 802.11e.
- WMM Power Save, based upon APSD within IEEE 802.11e
- Wi-Fi Protected Setup, a specification developed by the Alliance to ease the process of setting up and enabling security protections on small office and consumer Wi-Fi networks.
- Application Specific Device (ASD), for wireless devices other than Access Point and Station which has specific application, such as DVD players, projectors, printers, etc.
- Converged Wireless Group–Radio Frequency (CWG-RF, offered in conjunction with CTIA), to provide performance mapping of Wi-Fi and cellular radios in converged devices.
- Passpoint/Hotspot 2.0

== Certification programs ==
There are a number of certification programs by Wi-Fi alliance:

=== 2.4/5/6GHz Wi-Fi ===
Wi-Fi and IEEE 802.11 generations
Genera- tion	IEEE standard	Adopt- ed	Link rate (Mbit/s)	Frequency (GHz)		
Genera- tion	IEEE standard	Adopt- ed	Link rate (Mbit/s)	2.4	5	6
—	802.11	1997	1–2	Yes		
—	802.11b	1999	1–11	Yes		
—	802.11a	1999	6–54		Yes	
—	802.11g	2003	6–54	Yes		
Wi-Fi 4	802.11n	2009	6.5–600	Yes	Yes	
Wi-Fi 5	802.11ac	2013	6.5–6,933	(Note: 802.11ac only specifies operation in the 5 GHz band. Operation in the 2.4 GHz band is specified by 802.11n.)	Yes	
Wi-Fi 6	802.11ax	2021	0.4–9,608	Yes	Yes	
Wi-Fi 6E	802.11ax	2021	0.4–9,608	Yes	Yes	Yes
Wi-Fi 7	802.11be	2024	0.4–23,059	Yes	Yes	Yes
Wi-Fi 8	802.11bn	TBA	0.4–23,059	Yes	Yes	Yes

The 802.11 protocols are IEEE standards, identified as 802.11b, 11g, 11n, 11ac, etc. In 2018 The Wi-Fi Alliance created the simpler generation labels Wi-Fi 4 - 6 beginning with Wi-Fi 5, retroactively added Wi-Fi 4 and later added Wi-Fi 6 and Wi-Fi 6E. Wi-Fi 5 had Wave 1 and Wave 2 phases. Wi-Fi 6E extends the 2.4/5 GHz range to 6 GHz, where licensed. Listed in historical and capacity order. See the individual 802.11 articles for version details or 802.11 for a composite summary.

=== WiGig ===
WiGig refers to 60 GHz wireless local area network connection. It was initially announced in 2013 by Wireless Gigabit Alliance, and was adopted by the Wi-Fi Alliance in 2013. They started certifying in 2016. The first version of WiGig is IEEE 802.11ad, and a newer version IEEE 802.11ay was released in 2021.

=== Wi-Fi Direct ===
In October 2010, the Alliance began to certify Wi-Fi Direct, that allows Wi-Fi-enabled devices to communicate directly with each other by setting up ad-hoc networks, without going through a wireless access point or hotspot. Since 2009 when it was first announced, some suggested Wi-Fi Direct might replace the need for Bluetooth on applications that do not rely on Bluetooth low energy.

=== WPA ===
Wi-Fi Protected Access is a security mechanism based on IEEE 802.11i amendment to the standard that the Wi-Fi Alliance started to certify from the year of 2003.

=== IBSS with Wi-Fi Protected Setup ===
IBSS with Wi-Fi Protected Setup would enable the creation of ad hoc network between devices directly without central access point.

=== Wi-Fi Passpoint ===
Wi-Fi Passpoint, alternatively known as Hotspot 2.0, is a solution for enabling inter-carrier roaming. It utilizes IEEE 802.11u.

=== Wi-Fi Easy Connect ===
Wi-Fi Easy Connect is a protocol that would enable easily establishing connections via QR code.

=== Wi-Fi Protected Setup ===
Wi-Fi Protected Setup (WPS) is a network security standard to simply create a secure wireless home network, created and introduced by Wi-Fi Alliance in 2006.

=== Miracast ===
Miracast, introduced in 2012, is a standard for wireless display connections from devices such as laptops, tablets, or smartphones. Its goal is to replace cables connecting from the device to the display.

=== Wi-Fi Aware ===
Wi-Fi Aware or Neighbor Awareness Networking (NAN) is an interoperability certification program announced in January 2015 that enables device users, when in the range of a particular access point or another compatible device, to receive notifications of applications or services available in the proximity. Later versions of this standard included new features such as the capability to establish a peer-to-peer data connection for file transfer.

Fears were voiced immediately in media that it would be predominantly used for proximity marketing.

Unlike Wi-Fi Direct, introduced in 2010, which establishes peer-to-peer connections using a group owner that acts as an access point, Wi-Fi Aware uses a separate protocol for proximity-based discovery and can establish direct data connections without forming a Wi-Fi Direct group.

=== Wi-Fi Location ===
Wi-Fi Location is a type of Wi-Fi positioning system, and the certification could help providing accuracy to in-door positioning.

=== TDLS ===
TDLS, or Tunneled Direct Link Setup, is "a seamless way to stream media and other data faster between devices already on the same Wi-Fi network" based on IEEE 802.11z and added to Wi-Fi Alliance certification program in 2012. Devices using it communicate directly with one another, without involving the wireless network's router.

=== Wi-Fi Agile Multiband ===
The certification of Wi-Fi Agile Multiband indicate devices can automatically connect and maintain connection in the most suitable way. It covers the IEEE 802.11k standard about access point information report, the IEEE 802.11v standard that enable exchanging information about state of network, IEEE 802.11u standard about additional information of a Wi-Fi network, IEEE 802.11r about fast transition roaming between different access points, as well as other technologies specified by Wi-Fi alliance.

=== Wi-Fi EasyMesh ===
Wi-Fi EasyMesh is a certification program based on its Multi-Access Point specification for creating Wi-Fi meshes from products by different vendors, based on IEEE 1905.1. It is intended to address the problem of Wi-Fi systems that need to cover large areas where several routers serve as multiple access points, working together to form a larger/extended and unified network.

=== Wi-Fi Vantage ===
Formerly known as Carrier Wi-Fi, Wi-Fi Vantage is a certification program for operators to maintain and manage quality Wi-Fi connections in high usage environment. It includes a number of certification, such as Wi-Fi certified ac (as in 802.11ac), Passpoint, Agile Multiband, and Optimized Connectivity.

=== WMM ===
Wi-Fi Multimedia (WMM) or known as Wireless Multimedia Extensions is a Wi-Fi Alliance interoperability certification based on the IEEE 802.11e standard. It provides basic quality of service (QoS) features to IEEE 802.11 networks.

=== Wi-Fi Home Design ===
Wi-Fi Home Design is a set of guidelines released by Wi-Fi alliance for inclusion of wireless network in home design.

=== Wi-Fi HaLow ===
Wi-Fi HaLow is a standard for low-power wide-area (LPWA) connection standard using sub-1 GHz spectrum for IoT devices. It is based on IEEE 802.11ah.
