= TDLS =

TDLS, shortened from Tunneled Direct Link Setup, is "a seamless way to stream media and other data faster between devices already on the same Wi-Fi network." Devices using it communicate directly with one another, without involving the wireless network's router.

Wi-Fi Alliance added certification for TDLS in 2012. It describes this feature as technology that enables devices to link directly to one another when connected to a traditional Wi-Fi network. Wi-Fi CERTIFIED TDLS devices can set up secure links and transfer data directly between them. TDLS-linked devices benefit from an optimized connection to do things such as streaming video or synching content, without burdening the network as a whole.

The IEEE has endorsed this as the IEEE 802.11z standard.

Google's Cast protocol used by Chromecast utilizes TDLS to initiate screen mirroring.

== See also ==
- Wi-Fi Direct
