= Resource Unit =

Unit used in 802.11 wireless

A Resource Unit (RU), in OFDMA terminology used in 802.11ax WLAN, is a given 78.125 kHz bandwidth subcarrier (tone) used in both DownLink (DL) and UpLink (UL) transmissions. With OFDMA, different transmit powers may be applied to different RUs. There are maximum of 9 RUs for 20 MHz bandwidth, 18 in case of 40 MHz and more in case of 80 or 160 MHz bandwidth. The use of RUs enable an access point to allow multiple WLAN stations to access it simultaneously and efficiently.

== Description ==
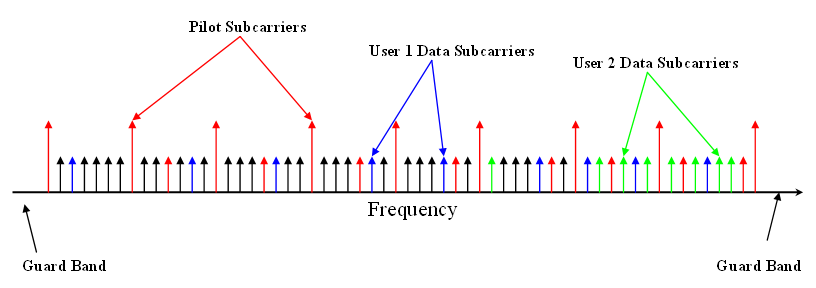
Subcarriers

In the older WLAN standard (802.11ac) only single-user station is allowed to transmit (uplink transmission) at one point in time, although multi-user downlink (DL-MU-MIMO) from AP to Non-AP stations has been supported through MIMO beamforming. The more stations active in the network, the longer the stations need to wait before allowed to transmit, hence the overall use of wireless channels is inefficient.

802.11ax WLAN is the first WLAN standard to use OFDMA to enable transmissions with multiple users simultaneously (it is called High Efficiency Multi Users [HE-MU] Access). In OFDMA, a symbol is constructed of subcarriers where the total number defines a Physical Layer PDU bandwidth. Each user is assigned different subsets of subcarriers to achieve simultaneous data transmission in MU (Multi-Users) environment. The more subcarriers are used, the longer their symbol rate is, which means that the overall rate of information remains the same. For example, in 20 MHz OFDMA bandwidth there is a total of 256 subcarriers (tones) which are grouped in sub-channels (or Resource Units).

There are three subcarrier types used in OFDMA WLAN:

1. Data subcarrier; used for actual data transmission
2. Pilot subcarrier; used for phase information and parameter tracking
3. Unused subcarrier which is neither data nor pilot subcarrier. This includes DC, Guard band and null subcarriers.

There are a few RUs currently defined: 26-tone RU, 52-tone RU, 106-tone RU, 242-tone RU (primary channel), 484-tone RU, 996-tone RU and 2×996-tone RU. For example, for basic 20 MHz bandwidth, nine 26-tone RUs can be used, but only four with 52-tone RUs.

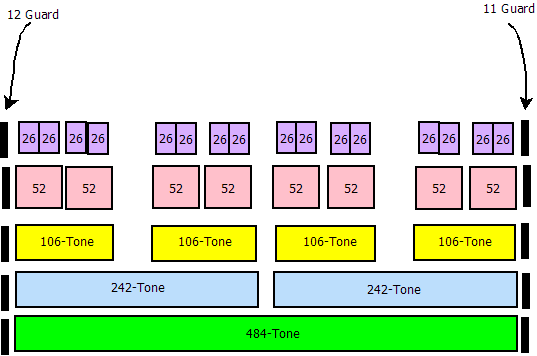
RU locations in 40 MHz HE PPDU

For example, when an AP supports 52-tone RUs for its 20-MHz bandwidth, four users can transmit and/or receive simultaneously to the AP (each uses 52-tones, but the total bandwidth for all users must be less than or equal the whole 20-MHz full allocated bandwidth). This scheme increases efficiency, compared to older method (802.11ac) where only a single user can transmit (uplink transmission) at a time (it uses the whole allocated 20 MHz bandwidth), while the rest must wait their turn. When there is only one user in the network, if necessary it can still use the whole 20-MHz bandwidth by operating at 242-tone RU to reach higher data rate.

A 52-Tone RU consists of 48 data subcarriers and 4 pilot subcarriers. 106-tone RU consists of 102 data subcarriers and 4 pilot subcarriers, while A 242-tone RU consists of 234 data subcarriers and 8 pilot subcarriers. A 484-tone RU consists of 468 data subcarriers and 16 pilot subcarriers, A 996-tone RU consists of 980 data subcarriers and 16 pilot subcarriers and A 2×996-tone RU consists of two 996-tone RUs, each located at each half of the PPDU bandwidth for 160 MHz and 80+80 MHz HE PPDU formats.

For backward compatibility, when a 802.11ax-capable station communicates with non-802.11ax-capable station both stations can only use 242-Tone-RU (the entire primary channel). To achieve that, both management and control frames must still be transmitted over standard OFDM subcarriers of the entire primary channel as well by both stations.

Maximum number of RUs for each Channel Bandwidth (CBW)
RU Type	CBW20	CBW40	CBW80	CBW80+80 and CMW160
26-Tone RU	9	18	37	74
52-Tone RU	4	8	16	32
106-Tone RU	2	4	8	16
242-Tone RU	1	2	4	8
484-Tone RU	N/A	1	2	4
996-Tone RU	N/A	N/A	1	2
2×996 Tone RU	N/A	N/A	N/A	1

RU	Data Subcarriers	Pilot Subcarriers
26-Tone RU	24	2
52-Tone RU	48	4
106-Tone RU	102	4
242-Tone RU	234	8
484-Tone RU	468	16
996-Tone RU	980	16
2×996 Tone RU	1960	32

Resource Units allocation is also used in MIMO transmission to enable multiple users to use MIMO at the same time.

== Uplink transmission ==
A new mechanism for uplink transmission (UL) from multiple Non-AP stations simultaneously to AP station is introduced in 802.11ax which is called Triggered Uplink Access (TUA). This new mechanism relies on a new type of 802.11 MAC frame called Trigger Frame sent by AP station.

An HE-enabled AP station first solicits a trigger frame to non-AP HE-enabled stations to initiate OFDMA or MU-MIMO transmissions before other non-AP stations start sending. This frame identifies non-AP stations participating in the UL MU transmissions and assigns RUs to these stations. Each non-AP station receiving the trigger frame sends its own HE TB (Trigger-Based) PPDU back to AP using the assigned RUs. They may send Null-Data frames if there is no actual data to send at the moment.

== Downlink transmission ==
AP station holds the RU allocation information for every peer Non-AP station associated with it, so it simply sends frames using downlink MU-MIMO (using multiple antennas to send multipath signals to stations), DL OFDMA (RU allocations) technique or combination of the two techniques.

== See also ==
- Frequency-division multiple access
- Single-carrier FDMA (SC-FDMA), a.k.a. linearly precoded OFDMA (LP-OFDMA)
