= ITU-T G.9991 =

ITU-T standard for indoor line-of-sight optical networking

ITU-T G.9991 (provisionally known as G.vlc) is a standard developed by ITU-T for indoor line-of-sight optical networking.

G.9991 was approved in March 2019. It is used by Signify (formerly Philips Lighting) as the basis for their optical communication products.

== See also ==
- IEEE 802.11bb, an IEEE standard for line-of-sight optical networking approved in 2023
- IrDA, an early low-speed infrared communication protocol
