= IEEE 802.11j-2004 =

IEEE 802.11 variation designed specially for Japanese market

802.11j-2004 or 802.11j is an amendment to the IEEE 802.11 standard designed specially for Japanese market. It allows wireless LAN operation in the 4.9–5.0 GHz band to conform to the Japanese rules for radio operation for indoor, outdoor and mobile applications. The amendment has been incorporated into the published IEEE 802.11-2007 standard.

802.11 is a set of IEEE standards that govern wireless networking transmission methods. They are commonly used today in their 802.11a, 802.11b, 802.11g and 802.11n versions to provide wireless connectivity in the home, office and some commercial establishments.

== 4.9–5.0 GHz operation in Japan ==
The 802.11j standard "Wireless LAN Medium Access Control (MAC) and Physical Layer (PHY) Specifications: [4.9–5.0 GHz] Operation in Japan" is designed specially for the Japanese market. Finalized in 2004, the standard works in the 4.9–5.0 GHz band to conform to the Japanese rules for radio operation for indoor, outdoor and mobile applications.

802.11j defines uniform methods that let APs move to new frequencies or change channel width for better performance or capacity—for example, to avoid interference with other wireless applications.

Registration is necessary to use this frequency band. Currently the 4900–5000 MHz spectrum is available for use while 5030–5091 MHz spectrum have been revoked.

== In the United States ==
In the United States, the 4.9 GHz band is reserved for use by public safety wireless applications. The transmission mask is narrower for the public safety band than for consumer part 15 applications. Thus one cannot simply operate 802.11j equipment in the public safety band and be FCC compliant. Public safety agencies are working with manufacturers and the FCC in order to leverage commercial off-the-shelf (COTS) equipment. As of 2005 there were public safety groups working closely with the manufacturing community, federal interests, and standards bodies to create an 802.11 series standard for public safety.

== See also ==
- IEEE 802.11a
- IEEE 802.11h
- IEEE 802.11p
