= Station (networking) =

Network device with capability to use the 802.11 protocol

In IEEE 802.11 (Wi-Fi) terminology, a station (abbreviated as STA) is a device that has the capability to use the 802.11 protocol. For example, a station may be a laptop, a desktop PC, PDA, access point or Wi-Fi phone. An STA may be fixed, mobile or portable. Generally, in wireless networking terminology, a station, a wireless client and a node are often used interchangeably, with no strict distinction existing between these terms. A station may also be referred to as a transmitter or receiver based on its transmission characteristics. IEEE 802.11-2007 formally defines station as: Any device that contains an IEEE 802.11-conformant media access control (MAC) and physical layer (PHY) interface to the wireless medium (WM).

== See also ==
- Basic Service Set
- Service set identifier
