= Pulse-position modulation =

Form of signal modulation using time shifts

Pulse-position modulation (PPM) is a form of signal modulation in which M message bits are encoded by transmitting a single pulse in one of $2^M$ possible required time shifts. This is repeated every T seconds, such that the transmitted bit rate is $M/T$ bits per second. It is primarily useful for optical communications systems, which tend to have little or no multipath interference.

== History ==
An ancient use of pulse-position modulation was the Greek hydraulic semaphore system invented by Aeneas Stymphalus around 350 B.C. that used the water clock principle to time signals. In this system, the draining of water acts as the timing device, and torches are used to signal the pulses. The system used identical water-filled containers whose drain could be turned on and off, and a float with a rod marked with various predetermined codes that represented military messages. The operators would place the containers on hills so they could be seen from each other at a distance. To send a message, the operators would use torches to signal the beginning and ending of the draining of the water, and the marking on the rod attached to the float would indicate the message.

In modern times, pulse-position modulation has origins in telegraph time-division multiplexing, which dates back to 1853, and evolved alongside pulse-code modulation and pulse-width modulation. In the early 1960s, Don Mathers and Doug Spreng of NASA invented pulse-position modulation used in radio-control (R/C) systems. PPM is currently being used in fiber-optic communications, deep-space communications, and continues to be used in R/C systems.

== Synchronization ==
One of the key difficulties of implementing this technique is that the receiver must be properly synchronized to align the local clock with the beginning of each symbol. Therefore, it is often implemented differentially as differential pulse-position modulation, whereby each pulse position is encoded relative to the previous, such that the receiver must only measure the difference in the arrival time of successive pulses. It is possible to limit the propagation of errors to adjacent symbols, so that an error in measuring the differential delay of one pulse will affect only two symbols, instead of affecting all successive measurements.

== Sensitivity to multipath interference ==
Aside from the issues regarding receiver synchronization, the key disadvantage of PPM is that it is inherently sensitive to multipath interference that arises in channels with frequency-selective fading, whereby the receiver's signal contains one or more echoes of each transmitted pulse. Since the information is encoded in the time of arrival (either differentially, or relative to a common clock), the presence of one or more echoes can make it extremely difficult, if not impossible, to accurately determine the correct pulse position corresponding to the transmitted pulse. Multipath in Pulse Position Modulation systems can be easily mitigated by using the same techniques that are used in Radar systems that rely totally on synchronization and time of arrival of the received pulse to obtain their range position in the presence of echoes.

== Non-coherent detection ==
One of the principal advantages of PPM is that it is an M-ary modulation technique that can be implemented non-coherently, such that the receiver does not need to use a phase-locked loop (PLL) to track the phase of the carrier. This makes it a suitable candidate for optical communications systems, where coherent phase modulation and detection are difficult and extremely expensive. The only other common M-ary non-coherent modulation technique is M-ary frequency-shift keying (M-FSK), which is the frequency-domain dual to PPM.

== PPM vs. M-FSK ==
PPM and M-FSK systems with the same bandwidth, average power, and transmission rate of M/T bits per second have identical performance in an additive white Gaussian noise (AWGN) channel. However, their performance differs greatly when comparing frequency-selective and frequency-flat fading channels. Whereas frequency-selective fading produces echoes that are highly disruptive for any of the M time-shifts used to encode PPM data, it selectively disrupts only some of the M possible frequency-shifts used to encode data for M-FSK. On the other hand, frequency-flat fading is more disruptive for M-FSK than PPM, as all M of the possible frequency-shifts are impaired by fading, while the short duration of the PPM pulse means that only a few of the M time-shifts are heavily impaired by fading.

Optical communications systems tend to have weak multipath distortions, and PPM is a viable modulation scheme in many such applications.

== Applications for RF communications ==
Narrowband RF (radio frequency) channels with low power and long wavelengths (i.e., low frequency) are affected primarily by flat fading, and PPM is better suited than M-FSK to be used in these scenarios. One common application with these channel characteristics, first used in the early 1960s with top-end HF (as low as 27 MHz) frequencies into the low-end VHF band frequencies (30 MHz to 75 MHz for RC use depending on location), is the radio control of model aircraft, boats and cars, originally known as "digital proportional" radio control. PPM is employed in these systems, with the position of each pulse representing the angular position of an analogue control on the transmitter, or possible states of a binary switch. The number of pulses per frame gives the number of controllable channels available. The advantage of using PPM for this type of application is that the electronics required to decode the signal are extremely simple, which leads to small, light-weight receiver/decoder units (model aircraft require parts that are as lightweight as possible). Servos made for model radio control include some of the electronics required to convert the pulse to the motor position – the receiver is required to first extract the information from the received radio signal through its intermediate frequency section, then demultiplex the separate channels from the serial stream, and feed the control pulses to each servo.

== PPM encoding for radio control ==
A complete PPM frame is about 22.5 ms (can vary between implementation), and signal low state is always 0.3 ms. It begins with a start frame (high state for more than 2 ms). Each channel (up to 8) is encoded by the time of the high state plus the lower state. (PPM high state + 0.3 = servo PWM pulse width).

More sophisticated radio control systems are now often based on pulse-code modulation, which is more complex but offers greater flexibility and reliability. The advent of 2.4 GHz band FHSS radio-control systems in the early 21st century changed this further.

Pulse-position modulation is also used for communication with the ISO/IEC 15693 contactless smart card, as well as in the HF implementation of the Electronic Product Code (EPC) Class 1 protocol for RFID tags.

== See also ==
- Pulse-amplitude modulation
- Pulse-code modulation
- Pulse-density modulation
- Pulse-width modulation
- Ultra wideband
