= IEEE 802.11bb =

Wireless networking standard

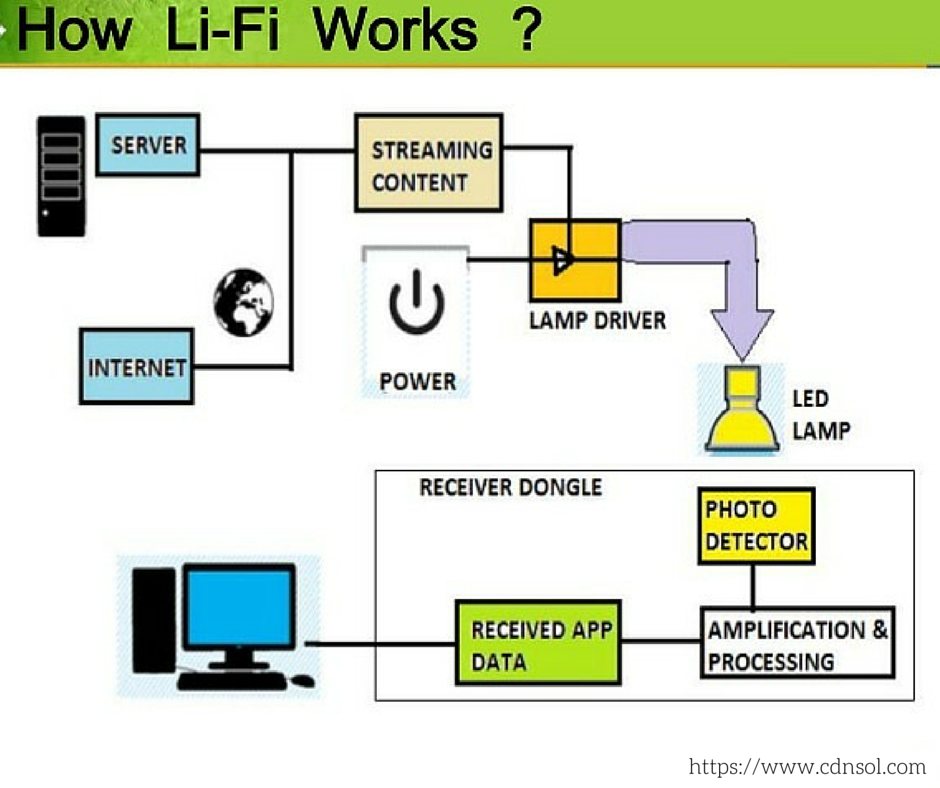

IEEE 802.11bb is a line-of-sight light-based wireless networking standard that is part of the 802.11 suite of standards, which defines an interoperable communications protocol for Li-Fi devices. Its proponents state that it will allow for very high speed communication that is faster than Wi-Fi.

Li-Fi is intended to provide better bandwidth compared to microwave. To achieve faster speeds the standard will likely need to adopt some of the technologies used with optical fiber based networking. Multiple channels can reach extremely high speeds.

The 802.11bb standard describes the use of light in the near-infrared 800 to 1000 nm waveband to implement data rates between 10 Mbit/s and 9.6 Gbit/s, with interoperability between devices with different capabilities.

Development of 802.11bb was carried out by the IEEE 802.11 Light Communications Task Group. Companies participating in the standardization effort included pureLiFi and Fraunhofer HHI.

== See also ==
- ITU-T G.9991, an ITU standard for line of sight optical networking approved in 2019
- IrDA, an early low-speed infrared communication protocol
