= Wlan slovenija =

wlan slovenija
- Network Name (short): wlan slovenija
- Location: Ljubljana, Slovenia
- Home page: https://wlan-si.net
- Nodes database: wlan slovenija database
- Active users: more than 42000 (nonunique, as of June 2010)
- Operational: Yes
- Commercial: No

The wlan slovenija open wireless network of Slovenia is an initiative for deployment of open and free community wireless network across all Slovenia through collaboration and with use of off-the-shelf widely available equipment. The main idea is that if everyone deploys a node of the open network in their home and share part of their Internet connectivity with others around them, then whole Slovenia will be covered with the wireless network which will allow everyone free basic connectivity to Internet. With this idea it operates since 2009 onward.

The network is based on open source software and hardware which has been developed by participants as well. It is one of largest Slovenian open source projects and has participated multiple times in Google Summer of Code.

== General description ==
wlan slovenija open wireless network is an example of a wireless community network. It uses common and widespread wireless technologies based on IEEE 802.11 standards, open source systems and because of its wireless and innovative organic nature its spread and access to the network is limited only with participation of users in it: more users there is more the network is spread and useful, for more purposes users can use it, more and richer content it provides.

Around the network, which is in the first place an initiative, a community of people and organizations is forming and thus ideas, motivations and concepts around the network are various as participants in the network are various. But mostly all agree about common reasons for the network: free access and sharing of knowledge and information, building an alternative media and because it is interesting, educational and fun. More people put up nodes of the wireless networks, more people share their Internet uplinks with others, more everybody gains.

wlan slovenija tries to attract also people without technical skills but who still share common philosophy. Because of this wlan slovenija focuses on ease to use, proven good practices, polished open source technologies which not just work but also have good user experience, combined with education, lectures and workshops to teach people about wireless technologies and possible ways of contributing to the network. Nodes used are open and accessible and they protect shared uplinks with using VPN to connect to the rest of the network.

The network is constantly growing around Slovenia and other countries. For example, in Croatia it is known under the name Otvorena mreža.

Participants are developing open technologies for use in the network to make wireless technologies better and easier to use:

- nodewatcher helps with coordination with deployment of the network and its monitoring
- Tunneldigger provides performant VPN system
- Koruza, equipment for wireless optical connections
- some participants add to their nodes also various sensors, which data is then collected by nodewatcher

== nodewatcher ==
For easier planning, deployment and maintenance of the network nodewatcher open source system has been developed. It allows coordination between participants in the network without requiring them to know each other.

It is a centralized web user interface which enables easier coordination and planning of a network with monitoring at the same time. Furthermore, it is also a web based firmware image generator which generates a customized image of a system for a given network node, so no node configuration after flashing is necessary.

The idea is that for participation in the network almost no technical skills are required. Users can simply register location of a new node and select some basic properties of a new node, where system fills more technical properties with good-practice defaults (the system also allows customization if the user wishes so). nodewatcher system then produces customized OpenWrt based firmware image with all configuration already included so the user just have to flash the wireless router, connect the node to electricity and possible uplink and node is connected to the network over VPN or wirelessly if there is a neighboring node somewhere in vicinity.

Afterward, nodewatcher monitors the node and displays gathered data about its performance in intuitive and graphical ways so users can understand how their node is working, how many users are using it, how much of their shared bandwidth is consumed... And all this through longer periods of time so better understanding of how the node interacts with the rest of the network is possible and easier planning of future nodes.
