= Bandwidth allocation =

Process of assigning radio frequencies to different applications

Bandwidth allocation is the process of assigning radio frequencies to different applications. The radio spectrum is a finite resource, which means there is great need for an effective allocation process. In the United States, the Federal Communications Commission or FCC has the responsibility of allocating discrete portions of the spectrum, or bands, to various industries. An example of the FCC doing this is the 2016 United States wireless spectrum auction, in which it incentivized broadcast stations to relinquish spectrum in order to open up more space for mobile data. Different bands of spectrum are able to transmit more data than others, and some bands of the spectrum transmit a clearer signal than others. Bands that are particularly fast or that have long range are of critical importance for companies that intend to operate a business involving wireless communications.

== FCC methods ==
=== Auctions ===
The FCC generally uses auctions to allocate bandwidth between companies. Some economists believe based on Auction Theory, auctions are the most efficient method of allocating resources. Due to the differences in the amount of data each band can transmit and the clarity of the signal, auctions allow the more desirable bands to sell for more. The United States currently auctions off bands that then become the property of purchaser. The FCC spectrum auctions have multiple rounds of bidding, as opposed to each party submitting one sealed bid. The FCC, when auctioning multiple bands, auctions them simultaneously. This allows for a more efficient bidding process, and keeps bands being auctioned at the end of the auction from being over or under valued. An example of this practice was the 700 MHz auction in 2008. While this method raises billions of dollars for the government, there is concern that smaller companies may be priced out of the market and therefore rendered unable to compete with large firms. This would reduce the number of points of view in the communications industry, which would violate one of the principles of the FCC, to protect the public interest. To help mitigate this concern, the FCC often sets aside a portion of the spectrum being auctioned so that it can only be bid on by smaller industry players.

=== Lotteries ===
Another method used to allocate bands of frequencies was lotteries. Lotteries were used by the FCC in the 1980s. A benefit of lotteries was that it gave all parties a chance at winning, unlike auctions which favor parties with more money. By giving all parties a chance it was believed that it served the public interest better. Some disadvantages of the lottery method was that some firm would engage in rent-seeking behavior, and try to get multiple licenses that they did not intend to use, but only intend to sell to another firm. In this situation not only were firms using rent-seeking behavior on a public resource, but the negotiations between firms could go on for years, meaning that frequencies were not being used and the public interest was not being served.

=== Comparative hearings ===
A third method used to allocate bands is the administrative process, also called comparative hearings. This method was used primarily before 1982. In this method all interested firms would make a presentation about why they should receive the license for that band of frequencies. Some advantages of this method are that they are flexible, meaning that FCC can use different criteria for different bands. This would allow the FCC to ensure that the public interest was acknowledged. There are also disadvantages to this method. A primary disadvantage is that the government does not raise revenue from hearing, as they would under other methods such as auctions. Along with the flexibility that the method allows for, it also can cause a lack of transparency because the criteria the decision is based on can differ from case to case. Another disadvantage is that the hearings process can take a long time to come to a conclusion.

The FCC is also responsible for reallocating bands of frequencies to different allocations. As new technologies develop the demand for frequency bands changes and makes some bands more desirable than previously. When this occurs, the FCC may make a decision to move an application to a different band of spectrum to make room for something else. In this case the FCC gives the existing application several years to prepare for the transition. An example of this transition when the FCC reallocated the 700mhz band from broadcast television to mobile phone applications. The FCC first voted to reallocate the band in 2002, however the broadcast television firms were not required to stop broadcasting until February 2009.

== Limitations of Bandwidth ==
The exponential increase in mobile data traffic during the decades of the 1990s and 2000s has led to the massive deployment of wireless systems. As a consequence, the limited available RF spectrum is subject to an aggressive spatial reuse and co-channel interference has become a major capacity limiting factor.

Therefore, there have been warnings of a looming "RF spectrum crisis" as the mobile data demands continue to increase while the network spectral efficiency saturates despite newly introduced standards and great technological advancements in the field.

It is estimated that by 2017, more than 11 exabytes of data traffic will have to be transferred through mobile networks every month. A possible solution is the replacement of some RF-technologies, like Wi-Fi, by others that do not use RF, like Li-Fi, as proposed by the Li-Fi Consortium.

=== Data crunch ===
The radio frequency spectrum is a limited natural resource which is increasingly in demand from a large and growing number of services such as fixed, mobile, broadcasting, amateur, space research, emergency telecommunications, meteorology, global positioning systems, environmental monitoring and communication services – that ensure safety of life on land, at sea and in the skies. Un-coordinated use can lead to malfunctioning of telecommunication services. ITU-R plays a key to ensure radio communications. In its capacity as the unique global radio spectrum manager, ITU-R identifies and harmonizes spectrum for use by wireless broadband systems, ensuring that these valuable frequencies are used efficiently and without interference from other radio systems. Allocates spectrum for communications (including mobile and broadcasting), satellite communications, and spectrum for advanced aeronautical communications, global maritime issues, protect frequencies for Earth-exploration satellites to monitor resources, emergencies, meteorology and climate change. Telecom services are converging and actors in the ICT world must adapt to all- IP (all data) networks. Data usage over wireless networks is rapidly increasing as more consumers surf the web, check email, and watch video on mobile devices. Moreover, according to Cisco, the surging growth in global mobile data traffic is projected to rise by sixty-six times by 2013, with video accounting for the lion's share of this increase in traffic. The evolution in data traffic foresees a future “data crunch”. In wireless services, this “data crunch” is putting further pressure on a more efficient use of spectrum. In the United States, according to FCC Chairman Julius Genachowski, "The explosive growth in mobile communications is outpacing our ability to keep up. If no proactive course is taken to update spectrum policies for the 21st century, limits will be reached. Some countries are already adapting to the impending crisis by investing in broadband and reassigning spectrum bands. ITU is raising awareness to promote investment in broadband and keeps working to improve spectrum management worldwide. However, the argument about a looming bandwidth crunch is refutable according to some points of view. Former FCC official Uzoma Onyeije conducted a study that questions the existence of a broadband spectrum crisis, and further goes on to suggest alternatives to existing networks that would mitigate the need to reallocate spectrum. Onyeije argues that before claiming a “Spectrum Crisis” exists, carriers should leverage available marketplace solutions to appease the current infrastructure namely upgrading network technology, adopting fair use policies, migrating voice to internet protocol, leveraging consumer infrastructure, enhancing carrier Infrastructure, packet prioritization, caching, channel bonding and encouraging the development of bandwidth-sensitive applications and devices. Alternatively, the User-in-the-loop paradigm mitigates the data crunch by shaping the demand side by involving all the users, which makes expensive over-provisioning obsolete.

Bandwidth allocation can also be used in reference to the computing industry, in scenarios such as allocating bandwidth to a web site running on a server, or allocating bandwidth to a computer on a network. Allocations in computing are often administered/enforced by terminating or temporarily suspending access once the allocated bandwidth has been utilized. Setting it to high increases download speed and the connectivity of other devices on the network.

== Control of bandwidth allocation ==
=== United States ===
The Federal Communications Commission (FCC) is an independent agency of the United States government that is responsible for allocating portions of the wireless spectrum for broadband, public safety, and the media.

=== Egypt ===
Unlike the government of the U.S., the government of Egypt does not have their own communications infrastructure, but private companies operate their own communication infrastructure. This non-government controlled allocation of communications became the unprecedented issue of discussion during the Egyptian social protests on January 25, 2011. The Egyptian government shut down all forms communications, including the internet and all on-line services. At first, the Egyptian government blocked the internet data usage for smart phones and black-berrys, and social media websites such as Facebook, Twitter, Instagram and YouTube as well. They also eventually cut off mobile phone service. This was possible even though the Egyptian government does not control communications because there are no agencies mandated to control communications. The fact is, the cooperation of the Internet service providers with the Egyptian government was necessary because they would otherwise have difficulties ethically running their business. If the government calls up the company service provider and makes a request within legal rights, then they give into the government's demands even if they are illegal according to the law. They have to follow the government's requests, in order to conduct business in that country.

== NTIA spectrum management & policy ==
=== Office of Spectrum Management (OSM) ===
The Office of Spectrum Management (OSM) is solely responsible for managing the United States Federal Government's usage of the radio frequency spectrum. OSM manages and works together with the sub-office, Interdepartment Radio Advisory Committee (IRAC) to execute various operations for Federal Government use. OSM and the IRAC collaborate to establish and issue policy regarding allocations and regulations governing the Federal Government's spectrum usage; develop plans for the peacetime and wartime use of the spectrum; prepare for, participate in, and implementing the results of international radio conferences; assigning frequencies; assigning of government specific frequencies; and maintaining Federal agencies new telecommunications systems and certifying that spectrum will be available. Additionally, the OSM together with the IRAC provides the technical engineering expertise needed to perform specific spectrum resources assessment and automated computer capabilities needed to carry out these investigations; participate in all aspects of the Federal Government's communications related emergency readiness activities; and participate in Federal Government telecommunication automated information systems security activities.

=== U.S. Federal Government spectrum management – Spectrum policy for 21st century ===
The 21st century has presented a society of wireless communications that has become a key element for a free society of information. Due to a modern need for fast and reliable information and communication the United States Federal Government has implemented the insurance of national and homeland defense, available public safety, first-responder services, and jobs revolving around research and service provision under the United States national radio communications services.

The United States and the President has additionally and personally established the position for spectrum management policies for Federal and non-Federal usage. The National Telecommunications and Information Administration (NTIA) continues annual regulation of spectrum bandwidth, specifically Federal usage. Additionally, an Executive Memorandum, issued directly from the President states a direct policy for continued improvements on spectrum management within the United States.

=== Spectrum Policy Task Force ===
Established in June 2002, the Spectrum Policy Task Force was created to help assist the Federal Communications Commission (FCC) in understanding the constant changing forces upon spectrum policy. The Spectrum Policy Task Force ultimately maximizes the public access, usage and benefits that derive from the radio spectrum.

Exact tasks of the Spectrum Task Force include the provision of specific information and recommendations to the FCC for evolving methods to the current “command and control” (C&C) approach to spectrum policy. The Spectrum Task Force also specializes in assisting the FCC in addressing spectrum issues such as: technical device/signal interference, spectrum efficiency, and effective public safety communications for domestic and international spectrum policies.

== See also ==
- Bandwidth allocation protocol
