= WZC =

WZC may refer to:

- Wireless Zero Configuration, a component of modern Microsoft Windows operating systems
- World Zionist Congress, a gathering organised by the World Zionist Organization
