= Wireless data =

Wireless data refers to transmitting information—voice, video, sensors, apps—without physical cables, using electromagnetic waves like radio, microwave, or infrared waves.

== Technologies and networks ==
=== Wi‑Fi (Wireless LAN) ===
- Connects devices via access points using IEEE 802.11 standards.
- Latest versions include Wi‑Fi 6/6E (using 2.4 GHz, 5 GHz, and now 6 GHz bands) offering higher throughput and efficiency

=== Cellular (3G/4G/5G/5G‑Advanced) ===
- 3G/4G (LTE) support broad data access.
- 5G launched globally since 2019; offers up to 10 Gbps speeds, extremely low latency, and supports massive IoT
- 5G‑Advanced (5.5G) introduces AI integration, edge compute, better slicing, non-terrestrial networks, aiming for full deployment by end of 2025.

=== Wireless PAN and others ===
- Bluetooth, Zigbee, UWB for short-range, low-energy data transfer (e.g., device pairing, indoor location)
- Satellite and Wide Area IoT networks (e.g., NB-IoT) allow remote connectivity

=== Niche and emerging ===
- IEEE 802.22 uses TV bands for rural broadband with AES-GCM encryption
- Free-Space Optical (FSO) Infrared beams achieved 5.7 Tbps over 4.6 km—no RF needed
- 6G (2027–30) envisions terahertz bands, AI-native networks, quantum comms, holographic beamforming

== Security and protocols ==
=== Wi‑Fi encryption ===
There are four main methods of Wi-Fi Encryption:

- WEP: outdated and insecure.
- WPA & WPA2: added TKIP and AES/CCMP, respectively
- WPA3: modern standard since 2018 with SAE, enhanced open (OWE), 192-bit enterprise, and protection of management frames

=== Trends in wireless security ===
The trend in wireless security is to move toward WPA3, Wi‑Fi 6E enhancements, private 5G/LTE (CBRS), UEM, AI/ML analytics, edge protection, and stronger identity access management.

== Architecture and standards ==
=== OSI layers ===
Wireless networks conform to the OSI model, each layer bringing unique threats and protections.

=== Protocol stacks ===
Wireless Application Protocol is the early mobile web stack (WSP/WDP/WTP/WTLS) designed for feature phones and constrained networks.

== Applications and use cases ==
- Consumer Internet access: Home Wi‑Fi and mobile broadband
- Enterprise mobility: BYOD management, secure campus networks
- IoT and industrial: Sensors, telemetry, remote control via Zigbee, private LTE, NB-IoT
- High-speed links: FSO for urban backhaul; IEEE 802.22 for rural broadband
- Future systems: 5G/6G to support smart cities, autonomous vehicles, XR, remote surgery

== See also ==
- Optical wireless communications
- Wireless telegraphy
