= LVX =

Technology companies of the United States

LVX System of Companies is the inventor of Visible light communication and Light Fidelity market. The LVX system is a collection of LED light bulbs and specialized equipment that allows transmission of data through photon pulse width modulation (PWM) of the LED.

== Development ==
The current speed at which the data is able to be transmitted is 3 Mbit/s. The goal of the LVX system is to free up wireless Wi-Fi spectrum which LVX asserts can be quite congested in some business areas. The 3 Mbit/s speed is slower than existing Wi-Fi technology, but the company is working on an improved LED which will be able to match the speeds of current Wi-Fi networks. The lights also have ability to transmit any specific colour along the spectrum.

== Benefits ==
Because the lights are also communication devices, they can be directed through the LVX network to turn a certain color to lead the way out of a building during emergencies or to a specific office. Lights can also be directed to turn on and off as an energy savings measure. The communication and networking capabilities are marketed as an add-on or "bonus" to the energy savings and maintenance inherited by LED lights in general as compared to fluorescent or incandescent light bulbs. LVX sells maintenance contracts in which it is be responsible for the lights' maintenance.

== See also ==
- Lumileds
