= Harald Haas =

German IT lecturer (born 1968)

Harald Haas FRSE (born 1968 in Neustadt an der Aisch) is a German engineer. He joined the University of Cambridge in April 2024 as Van Eck Professor of Engineering. He was formerly Professor of Mobile Communications at the University of Strathclyde and is the person who coined the term Li-Fi. In 2012 he was one of the co-founders of pureVLC (now pureLiFi). Haas was elected a Fellow of the Royal Society of Edinburgh in 2017 and of the Royal Academy of Engineering in 2019.
