= Spectrum Task Force =

Federal Communications Commission task force

The Spectrum Policy Task Force was established in June 2002 to assist the Federal Communications Commission in identifying and evaluating changes in spectrum policy that will increase the public benefits derived from the use of the radio spectrum.

== Background ==
The Spectrum Task Force was put in place to increase the efficiency of the use of the radio spectrum. In the beginning Federal Communications Commission was in complete control of the radio spectrum. It was the central authority that decided who gets what block of the spectrum with no charge and what use it would be put to. While this approach was effective, it was limited in a way that its exclusive nature was meant for technology that is dated now. Federal Communications Commission also approached alternative spectrum governance regimes for spectrum management like common spectrums and spectrum property rights model which have their own limitations and drawbacks. Spectrum Task Force was put in place to overlook all these regimes and use a method that encourage the highest and best use of spectrum domestically and internationally in order to provide the growth and rapid deployment of innovative and efficient communications technologies and services.

Former FCC Chairman Michael Powell said, "The government has an almost impossible task trying to keep pace with the ever increasing demand for spectrum and continuing advances in wireless technology and applications. In this fast-moving world, the Commission cannot rely on outmoded procedures and policies. We must establish new ways to support innovation and the efficient, flexible use of spectrum. While the Spectrum Policy Task Force has a difficult task ahead of it, I am pleased that it is making significant progress and that it is moving forward with a work plan."

== Principal SPTF Recommendations ==
The core focus of the Spectrum Policy Task Force is to ensure the efficient and effective use of the radio spectrum. The radio spectrum currently being used plays a vital role in a vast amount of government and commercial services. These services include radio and television broadcasts, satellite communications, wireless networks, public safety communications, weather forecasting, etc. The radio spectrum is the section of the electromagnetic spectrum that spans from about 3 kilohertz to 300 gigahertz. Television broadcasts, radios, mobile phones, and military and government communication systems are best operated in the 100 MHZ to 3GHz radio spectrum. The current use of the spectrum is mostly focused on the lower 1% of these frequencies. With the gradual increases in technological innovation and wireless communication, the usable part of the radio spectrum has also been greatly expanded. From here on, there will only be gradual increases in the technology and devices that depend on the radio spectrum for their functionality. The National Telecommunication and Information Administration (NTIA) deals with radio spectrum policies on the international level as well as federal government use of the radio spectrum. The allocation of the radio spectrum differs around the globe, but since electromagnetic waves travel the same way through the air, spectrum management decisions are generally coordinated internationally. The Federal Communications Commission's (FCC) primary focus is on all the nonfederal, state, and local governments' use of the spectrum. To manage the spectrum, both the NTIA and FCC used the "command-and-control" approach; they dictated how each segment of the radio spectrum is used and who is eligible to use it. The command-and-control approach worked in the initial days of wireless communication, but in order to meet the needs of new technology innovations and modern mobile devices using wireless communication, a policy was required that was more consumer-oriented. The FCC formed a task force—the Spectrum Policy Task Force—whose primary role was to evaluate changes in the spectrum policy, ensure the efficient and effective use of the spectrum, and derive public benefit from the use of the spectrum.

=== Command-and-Control and Market-oriented Rights Models ===
The command-and-control approach dictates how the radio spectrum will be segmented and which consumers will be eligible to use it. In the United States, the FCC is the centralized authority that regulates spectrum allocation and use. So far, the command-and-control approach has been the most commonly used method for spectrum management. Over the past decade, there has been a substantial increase in the technological innovations, mobile devices, and wireless services that use the radio spectrum. The command-and-control approach was useful for addressing the issues related to older wireless communication devices and services. With the new technologies and their increased demand for the radio spectrum, the command-and-control approach was simply at a disadvantage for spectrum management. In October 2001, Chairman Michael Powell, the FCC Chairman at that time, shared the difficulties that the government officials were experiencing when it came to the allocation and alignment of the radio spectrum to address the new emerging spectrum needs and services. In June 2002, the FCC Chairman established the Spectrum Policy Task Force to assist the FCC in evaluating changes in the spectrum, reevaluating the command-and-control approach, and helping to migrate it to a more consumer-oriented model. The command-and-control approach comprises the duties of allocating and segmenting the spectrum for specific types of services, e.g. radio, and ensuring that the services that use these bands adopt the service rules and technical standards. command-and-control also requires that the equipment from the major federal systems that use the spectrum be certified by the NTIA in order to evaluate the impact of the system on the spectrum. The certification includes properly researching the system, selecting the frequency bands used by the system, and then filing for review by the NTIA for federal systems. (The FCC reviews non-federal systems.) After the certification process is complete and the technical standards have been authorized, a portion of the radio spectrum is allocated to the individual entity or service provider and its use is allowed within a certain geographical area. Lastly, the command-and-control approach requires the NTIA and FCC to have proper measures in place to monitor the allocated spectrum, address any interference issues, keep the technical standards in check, and audit the geographic spectrum assignments. The goal from here onward was to create a more consumer-oriented model that would encourage the optimum use of the spectrum, lead growth in technological innovations, and provide effective and efficient communication technologies and services.

== Spectrum Policy Objectives ==
The core objectives of the task force are to ensure the efficient and effective use of the radio spectrum, encourage the best use of the spectrum domestically and internationally, encourage the growth of innovative and efficient communication technologies and services, and promote the deployment of spectrum technologies and services domestically and internationally.

=== Implement flexible market-oriented spectrum allocation ===
The Spectrum Policy Task Force will encourage the most effective and efficient use of the radio spectrum, increase the opportunities for new technological innovations, and ensure that there is ample spectrum available and allocated for public safety, commercial, and other communication services. The Spectrum Policy Task Force will evaluate and identify changes in spectrum policy and provide recommendations that will maximize public benefits gained from the use of the radio spectrum. The Task Force will also advise the FCC on the evaluation and refinement of spectrum assignment policies, which are not limited to the auction process. Spectrum auction is an auction process set up by the government to sell the rights to spectrum bands. Since radio spectrum is a scarce resource, the government uses the auction method to promote market-oriented spectrum management.

=== Efficient and effective use of the spectrum ===
The Spectrum Policy Task Force will ensure that the radio spectrum is being used efficiently and effectively. It will provide the FCC with recommendations to promote the efficient use of the spectrum by establishing the shared use of the spectrum between applicable users and service providers, building new license models that minimize the entry barriers for consumers to own spectrum bands, lessening the interference in spectrum bands, and encouraging new technological innovations like Internet-based protocols and cognitive radios. The following is the FCC's summary of its Secondary Markets Initiative:

==== Markets Initiative ====
"The FCC is taking significant steps to remove regulatory barriers and facilitate the development of secondary markets in spectrum usage rights among the Wireless Radio Services. In 2003, the FCC adopted its first Report and Order and Further Notice of Proposed Rulemaking, in which it established new policies and procedures to facilitate broader access to valuable spectrum resources through the use of spectrum leasing arrangements. It also streamlined procedures for approving license assignments and transfers of control. In 2004, the FCC adopted the Second Report and Order, Order on Reconsideration, and Second Further Notice, in which it provided for immediate processing of certain qualifying spectrum leasing and license assignment and transfer transactions. It also established the new regulatory concept, termed the 'private commons,' to provide additional access to spectrum in licensed bands. Finally, the FCC is seeking comment on additional steps it should take to further the development of advanced technologies that enable more efficient secondary markets in spectrum usage rights". .

=== Maximizing Spectrum Flexibility ===
The Spectrum Policy Task Force will advise ways to maximize the flexibility of the spectrum. "Flexibility" means granting both licensed and unlicensed users maximum freedom to access the spectrum when they can ensure that they are generating the highest value from their spectrum use. The flexibility of the spectrum offers autonomy only when the various spectrum users ensure that their use of the spectrum will not cause spectrum interference. Flexibility will give spectrum users the power to determine how best they will use their spectrum. From the FCC SPTF report of 2002: By leaving these choices to the spectrum user, this approach tends to lead to efficient and highly valued spectrum uses. In most instances, a flexible use approach is preferable to the Commission's traditional "command-and-control" approach to spectrum regulation, in which allowable spectrum uses are limited based on regulatory judgments. The Spectrum Policy Task Force will also recommend approaches to the FCC that allow licensed and unlicensed users flexibility of the spectrum and ensure that they comply with the technical rules regarding the use of different technical devices, power limits, interference rules, etc.

== Spectrum Policy Task Force Findings and Recommendations ==
The function of the task force is to gather preliminary data and, based on the data, provide the FCC with recommendations. Some of major findings identified by the Spectrum Policy Task Force include:

=== Radio spectrum interference tolerance ===
It is important to enable changes in the spectrum policy that will create potential for new radio systems that will use the spectrum more efficiently and are more tolerant to spectrum interference.

=== Quantify spectrum use ===
Preliminary data gathered by Spectrum Policy Task Force shows that a majority of the radio spectrum is not in use for a significant period of time. The use of the white spaces between the spectrums can be increased significantly. White spaces are the spectrum bands that exist between the used channels to minimize interference. Compared to the old analog signals, multiple digital signals can be packed into the spectrum band, allowing more transmissions. By allowing the use of new technologies and radio systems, this white space can be used more efficiently.

=== Regulatory models for both licensed and unlicensed users ===
The Spectrum Policy Task Force recommends flexibility of the spectrum for licensed and unlicensed users. Along with giving users the autonomy to make good use of the spectrum, the FCC should have clear regulations in place so that users can understand and comply with these rules, e.g. power limits and interference protection.

=== No single regulatory model should be applied to all spectrums ===
With Spectrum Task Force recommendations, the FCC should pursue a regulatory model that provides a balanced spectrum policy. The policy should include granting spectrum usage rights based on market-oriented model, which will promote more open access while using command and control regulations in limited circumstances. "The Task Force recommended that FCC pursue a spectrum management policy that includes both exclusive spectrum usage rights granted through market-based mechanisms and creates open access to spectrum 'commons,' with command-and-control regulation used in limited circumstances."
