= Koruza =

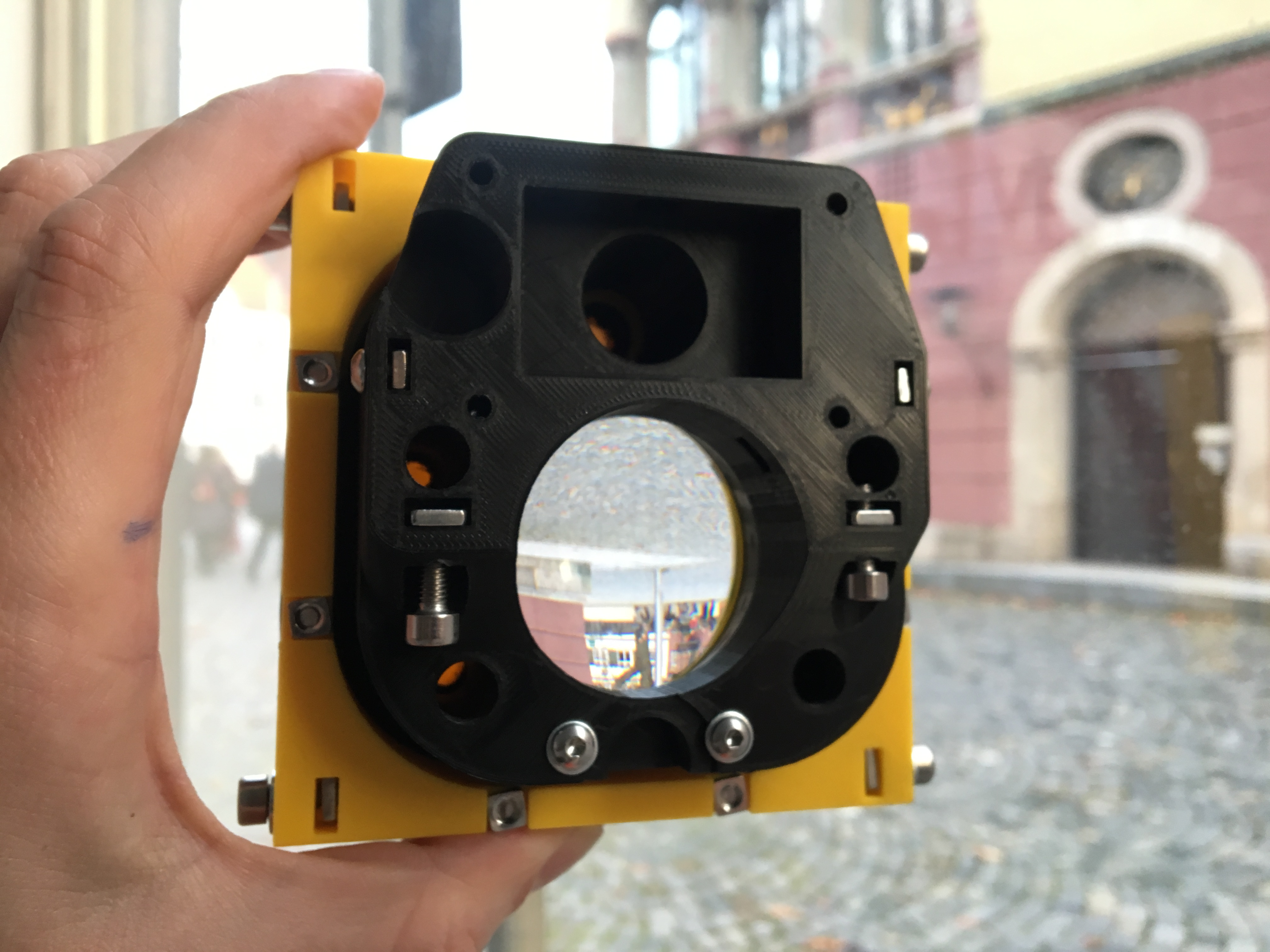
3D printed lens holder of KORUZA Scientific variant

Koruza is a Slovenian open source and open hardware project providing equipment for low-cost free-space wireless optical connections. One can use 3D printing to create their own equipment. It is based on use of existing SFP optical modules which brings the costs of manufacturing down. Because it uses infrared light it is an alternative to Wi-Fi and does not have issues with spectrum congestion and radio interference. It is available in 1 Gbit/s and 10 Gbit/s forms. Connection can be established at up to 100 m.

It is one of the projects funded by Shuttleworth Foundation through their fellows program.

== See also ==
- Free-space optical communication
- Optical wireless communications
