= Rendezvous delay =

TERM IN WIRELESS NETWORKING

Rendezvous delay is a term that pertains to mobile wireless networking, and the hand-off of a mobile device from one base station to a new base station. It is the amount of time elapsed for a mobile networked device to attach to the new base station after it has stopped its link with its old base station. The nature of this delay depends on the type of wireless network and the protocols used.
