= Wireless configuration utility =

Class of network management software

A wireless configuration utility, wireless configuration tool, wireless LAN client, or wireless connection management utility is a class of network management software that manages the activities and features of a wireless network connection. It may control the process of selecting an available access point, authenticating and associating to it and setting up other parameters of the wireless connection.

There are many wireless LAN clients available for use. Clients vary in technical aspects, support of protocols and other factors. Some clients only work with certain hardware devices, while others only on certain operating systems.

== Comparison ==
The table below compares various wireless LAN clients.

Gopal	Creator	First public release	Authentication	Security	Latest stable version (Release Date)	Cost	Operating systems	Limitations	Target audience
Cisco Secure Services Client	Cisco	2008	PEAP/MSCHAPv2, PEAP/TLS, PEAP/GTC, TTLS/PAP, TTLS/CHAP, TTLS/MSCHAP, TTLS/MSCHAPv2, TTLS/EAP-MD5, TTLS/EAP-MSCHAPv2, FAST/MSCHAPv2, FAST/GTC, FAST/TLS, TLS, LEAP, MSCHAPv2, GTC, MD5	WEP, WPA(TKIP/AES), WPA2(TKIP/AES), CCKM(TKIP/AES)	5.1.0	Trial	Windows	90-day full trial/Unlimited wired only.	Enterprise, Desktop, Workstation, Server, Windows users
Intel PROSet Wireless	Intel	—N/a	LEAP or EAP-FAST	WEP, WPA, WPA2	10.5.0.0	Free	Windows	Only for intel wireless modules	Desktop, Workstation, Server, Windows users
ThinkVantage Access Connections Manager	Lenovo	2006-APR-21	LEAP, EAP-TLS	WEP, WPA, WPA2	4.42	Free	Windows	Only for intel PRO/wireless modules	Desktop, Workstation, Server, Windows users
Cisco Aironet	Cisco	—N/a	LEAP, EAP	WEP, WPA, WPA2	ver	Free	Windows	—N/a	Desktop, Workstation, Server, Windows users
Microsoft Wireless Zero Configuration	Microsoft	October 25, 2001 (with Windows XP)	PEAP-ELS, PEAP-MS-CHAP v2	WEP, WPA, WPA2	ver	Free	Windows XP, Windows Server 2003	none	Desktop, Workstation, Server, Windows users
Dell Wireless LAN Card Utility	Dell	—N/a	—N/a	WEP, WPA, WPA2	ver 3.0	Free	Windows	Only for Cisco Aironet products	Desktop, Workstation, Server, Windows users
Broadcom WLAN Utility	Broadcom	—N/a	—N/a	WEP, WPA, WPA2	ver 6.0	Free	Windows	Only for Broadcom wireless modules	Desktop, Workstation, Server, Windows users
Juniper Networks Odyssey Access Client	Funk/Juniper	October 22, 2002	EAP-TLS, EAP-TTLS (inner: PAP, CHAP, MSCHAP, MSCHAPv2, PAPToken, EAP-GTC, EAP-MD5, EAP-SIM, EAP-AKA, EAP-POTP, EAP-MSCHAPv2, EAP-JUAC), EAP-PEAP (inner: EAP-GTC, EAP-POTP, EAP-TLS, EAP-MSCHAPv2, EAP-JUAC), EAP-FAST, EAP-MD5, EAP-GTC, EAP-LEAP, EAP-SIM, EAP-AKA, EAP-POTP	WEP, WPA, WPA2	5.20 (June 2010)	Varies, 30-day trial	Windows, Mac OS X	none	Enterprise, Government (FIPS Edition), Desktop, Workstation, Server, Windows users
NetworkManager	nm	—N/a	—N/a	WEP, WPA, WPA2	ver 0.6.4	Free (GNU)	Linux	Wireless drivers must support HAL	Desktop, Workstation, Server, Linux/Unix users

== See also ==
- Wireless tools for Linux
