= Li-Fi Consortium =

Optical wireless technology trade group

- Formation: October 2011
- Type: Trade group

The Li-Fi Consortium is an international organization focusing on optical wireless technologies. It was founded by four technology-based organizations in October 2011. The goal of the Li-Fi Consortium is to foster the development and distribution of (Li-Fi) optical wireless technologies such as communication, navigation, natural user interfaces and others.

== Status ==
As of 2012 the Li-Fi Consortium outlined a roadmap for different types of optical communication such as gigabit-class communication as well as a full-featured Li-Fi cloud, which includes many more besides wireless infrared, and visible light communication.
