= Li-Fi =

Wireless communication technology using visible light

Li-Fi Technology
- Introduced: March 2011; 15 years ago
- Industry: Digital communication
- Connector type: Visible light communication
- Visible light spectrum, ultraviolet and infrared radiation

Li-Fi (commonly referred to as LiFi) is a wireless communication technology which utilizes light to transmit data and position between devices. The term was first introduced by Harald Haas during a 2011 TEDGlobal talk in Edinburgh.

Unlike Wi-Fi, which uses radio frequency via an electric voltage in an antenna to transmit data, Li-Fi uses the modulation of light intensity. Li-Fi is able to function in areas otherwise susceptible to electromagnetic interference (e.g. aircraft cabins, hospitals, or military applications).

== Technology details ==
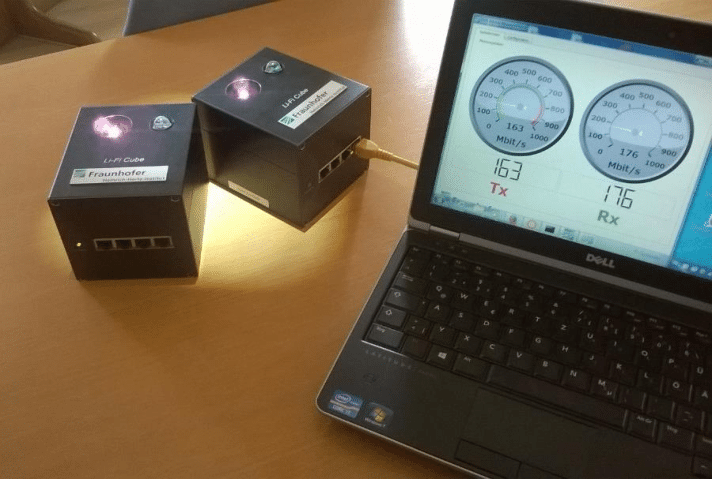
Li-Fi modules

Li-Fi is a derivative of optical wireless communications (OWC) technology, which uses light from light-emitting diodes (LEDs) as a medium to deliver mobile, high-speed network communication in a manner similar to that of Wi-Fi.

Visible light communications (VLC) works by switching the current to the LEDs off and on at a very high speed, beyond the human eye's ability to notice. The light waves cannot penetrate walls which translates to a shorter range and a lower potential of interception relative to Wi-Fi. Direct line of sight is not always necessary for Li-Fi to transmit a signal as light may reflect off walls, mirrors or other reflective objects.

Li-Fi can potentially be useful in electromagnetic sensitive areas without causing electromagnetic interference. Both Wi-Fi and Li-Fi transmit data over the electromagnetic spectrum, but whereas Wi-Fi utilizes radio waves, Li-Fi uses visible, ultraviolet, and infrared light. Researchers have reached data rates of over 224 Gbit/s.

While several companies produce Li-Fi products such as PureLiFi, Signify, Oledcomm, Terra Ferma and others; Wi-Fi and cellular remain the predominant communications technology for consumers, business, industrial and military applications. The first commercially available Li-Fi system was presented at the 2014 Mobile World Congress in Barcelona.

=== Disadvantages ===
Since Li-Fi's short wavelengths are unable to penetrate walls, transmitters would need to be installed in every room of a building to ensure even Li-Fi distribution. The high installation costs associated with this requirement to achieve a level of practicality of the technology is one of the potential downsides.

== History ==
The initial research on Visible Light Communication (VLC) was published by the Fraunhofer Institute for Telecommunications in September 2009, showcasing data rates of 125 Mbit/s over a 5 m distance using a standard white LED. In 2010, transmission rates were already increased to 513 Mbit/s using the DMT modulation format.

During his 2011 TED Global Talk, Professor Harald Haas, a Mobile Communications expert at the University of Edinburgh, introduced the term Li-Fi while discussing the concept of "wireless data from every light".

The general term visible light communication (VLC), whose history dates back to the 1880s, includes any use of the visible light portion of the electromagnetic spectrum to transmit information. The D-Light project, funded from January 2010 to January 2012 at Edinburgh's Institute for Digital Communications, was instrumental in advancing this technology, with Haas also contributing to the establishment of a company for its commercialization.

In October 2011, the Fraunhofer IPMS research organization and industry partners formed the Li-Fi Consortium, to promote high-speed optical wireless systems and to overcome the limited amount of radio-based wireless spectrum available by exploiting a completely different part of the electromagnetic spectrum.

The practical demonstration of VLC technology using Li-Fi took place in 2012, with transmission rates exceeding 1 Gbit/s achieved under laboratory conditions. In 2013, laboratory tests achieved speed of up to 10 Gbit/s. By August 2013, data rates of approximately 1.6 Gbit/s were demonstrated over a single color LED. A significant milestone was reached in September 2013 when it was stated that Li-Fi, or VLC systems in general, did not absolutely require line-of-sight conditions. In October 2013, it was reported Chinese manufacturers were working on Li-Fi development kits.

In April 2014, the Russian company Stins Coman announced the BeamCaster Li-Fi wireless local network, capable of data transfer speeds up to 10 gigabits per second (Gbit/s). They foresee boosting speeds up to 40 Gbit/s in the near future. In the same year, Sisoft, a Mexican company, set a new record by transferring data at speeds of up to 80 Gbit/s across a light spectrum emitted by LED lamps.

Current offerings by purelifi, Signify, oledcomm and Terra Ferma suggest Li-Fi full-duplex communications links can achieve over 1.0 Gbit/s. A study published by IEEE in 2021 suggests speeds of 224 Gbit/s are achievable.

In June 2018, Li-Fi successfully underwent testing at a BMW plant in Munich for industrial applications under the auspices of the Fraunhofer Heinrich-Hertz-Institute.

In August 2018, Kyle Academy in Scotland, piloted the usage within its premises, enabling students to receive data through rapid on–off transitions of room lighting.

In June 2019, Oledcomm, a French company, showcased its Li-Fi technology at the 2019 Paris Air Show.

In January 2025, Terra Ferma, a USA company announced the launch of their Helios and Fortis Li-Fi product lines for US and NATO Government and Military applications.

== Standards ==
Like Wi-Fi, Li-Fi is wireless and uses similar 802.11 protocols, but it also uses ultraviolet, infrared, and visible light communication (VLC).

One part of VLC is modeled after communication protocols established by the IEEE 802 workgroup. However, the IEEE 802.15.7 standard is out-of-date: it fails to consider the latest technological developments in the field of optical wireless communications, specifically with the introduction of optical orthogonal frequency-division multiplexing (O-OFDM) modulation methods which have been optimized for data rates, multiple-access, and energy efficiency. The introduction of O-OFDM means that a new drive for standardization of optical wireless communications is required.

Nonetheless, the IEEE 802.15.7 standard defines the physical layer (PHY) and media access control (MAC) layer. The standard is able to deliver enough data rates to transmit audio, video, and multimedia services. It takes into account optical transmission mobility, its compatibility with artificial lighting present in infrastructures, and the interference which may be generated by ambient lighting. The MAC layer permits using the link with the other layers as with the TCP/IP protocol.

The standard defines three PHY layers with different rates:

- The PHY 1 was established for outdoor application and works from 11.67 kbit/s to 267.6 kbit/s.
- The PHY 2 layer permits reaching data rates from 1.25 Mbit/s to 96 Mbit/s.
- The PHY 3 is used for many emissions sources with a particular modulation method called color shift keying (CSK). PHY III can deliver rates from 12 Mbit/s to 96 Mbit/s.

The modulation formats recognized for PHY I and PHY II are on–off keying (OOK) and variable pulse-position modulation (VPPM). The Manchester coding used for the PHY I and PHY II layers includes the clock inside the transmitted data by representing a logic 0 with an OOK symbol "01" and a logic 1 with an OOK symbol "10", all with a DC component. The DC component avoids light extinction in case of an extended run of logic 0's.

=== 802.11bb ===
In July 2023, the IEEE published the 802.11bb standard for light-based networking, intended to provide a vendor-neutral standard for the Li-Fi market.

== Potential applications ==
=== Underwater application ===
Most remotely operated underwater vehicles (ROVs) are controlled by wired connections. The length of their cabling places a hard limit on their operational range, and other potential factors such as the cable's weight and fragility may be restrictive. Since light can travel through water, Li-Fi–based communications could offer much greater mobility. Li-Fi's utility is limited by the distance light can penetrate water. Significant amounts of light do not penetrate further than 200 meters (660 ft). Past 1,000 meters (3,300 ft), no light penetrates.

=== Aviation ===
Efficient communication of data is possible in airborne environments such as a commercial passenger aircraft utilizing Li-Fi. Using this light-based data transmission will not interfere with equipment on the aircraft that relies on radio waves, such as its radar.

=== Hospital ===
Increasingly, medical facilities are using remote examinations and even procedures. Li-Fi systems could offer a better system to transmit low-latency, high-volume data. Besides providing a higher speed, light waves also have reduced effects on medical instruments. An example of this would be the possibility of wireless devices being used in MRIs similar radio sensitive procedures. Another application of Li‑Fi in hospitals is localisation of assets and personnel.

=== Advertising ===
Street lamps can be used to display advertisements for nearby businesses or attractions on cellular devices as an individual passes through. A customer walking into a store and passing through the store's front lights can show current sales and promotions on the customer's cellular device.

=== Warehousing ===
In warehousing, indoor positioning and navigation is a crucial element. 3D positioning helps robots to get a more detailed and realistic visual experience. Visible light from LED bulbs is used to send messages to the robots and other receivers and hence can be used to calculate the positioning of the objects.

== See also ==
- Bluetooth
- Free-space optical communication
- Heliograph
- Indoor positioning system (IPS)
- Infrared communication
- Infrared Data Association (IrDA)
- Near-field communication (NFC)
- Wi-Fi positioning system
- RONJA
- Spatial light modulator (SLM)
- Super Wi-Fi
- Wi-Fi Direct
- Wi-Fi
- Vaporware

== External li-fi links ==
- LiFi and WiFi Future Network Technology "Lifi" Know How Much Speed sameotech.com
- Introduction to Li-Fi Technology. electronicslovers.com
- What exactly is Li-Fi?
