= RONJA =

Optical point-to-point Free Space Optics data link

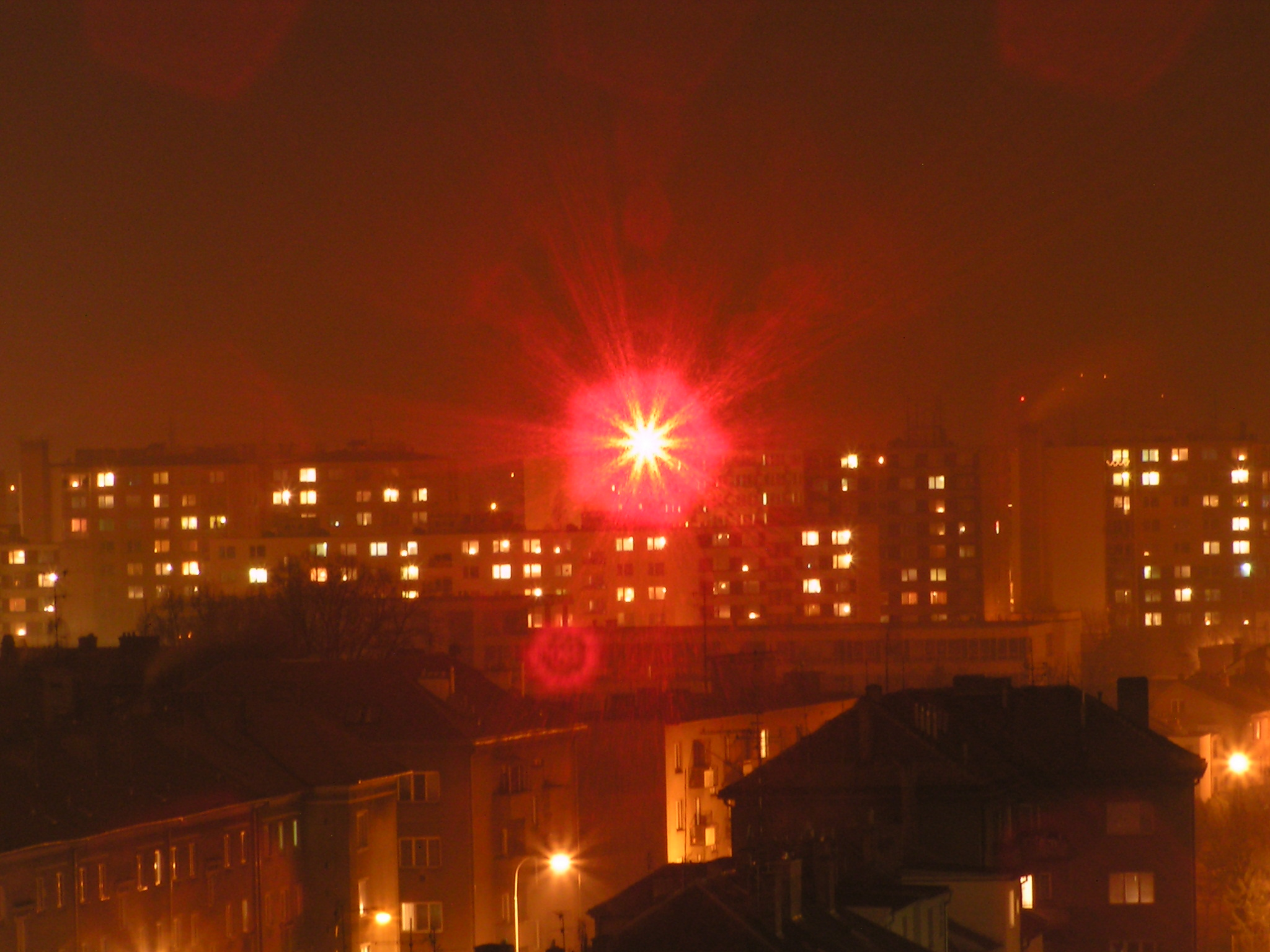
Single high-brightness LED with a cheap loupe lens creates a bright narrow beam that can stream DVD-quality video over neighbourhoods. The red beam is invisible when observed outside of its unobstructed path.

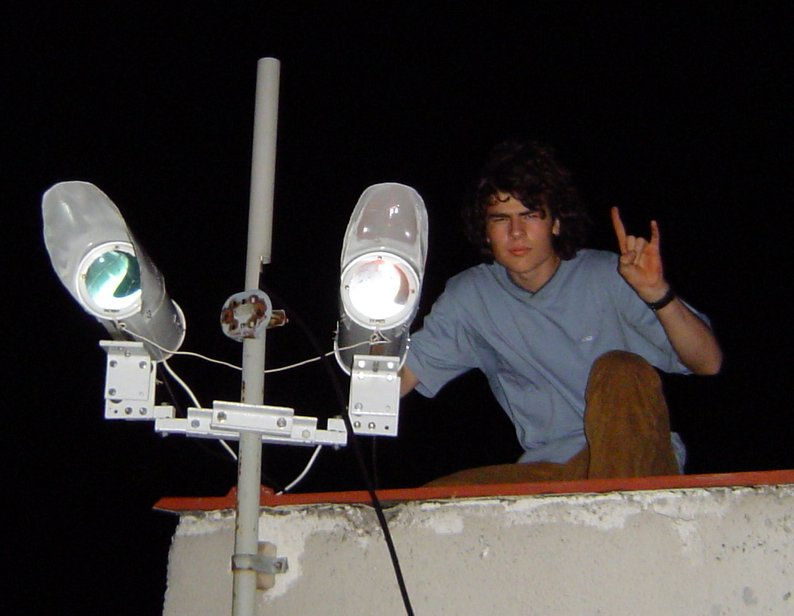
Twibright Ronja with 130-millimetre (5.1 in) diameter lenses, operating on a 1,205-metre (1,318 yd) link using visible red light, max. range 1,300 metres (1,400 yd), with HPWT-BD00-E4000 transmitter LED. Installed on a rooftop, with its user posing to the right, in Czech Republic.

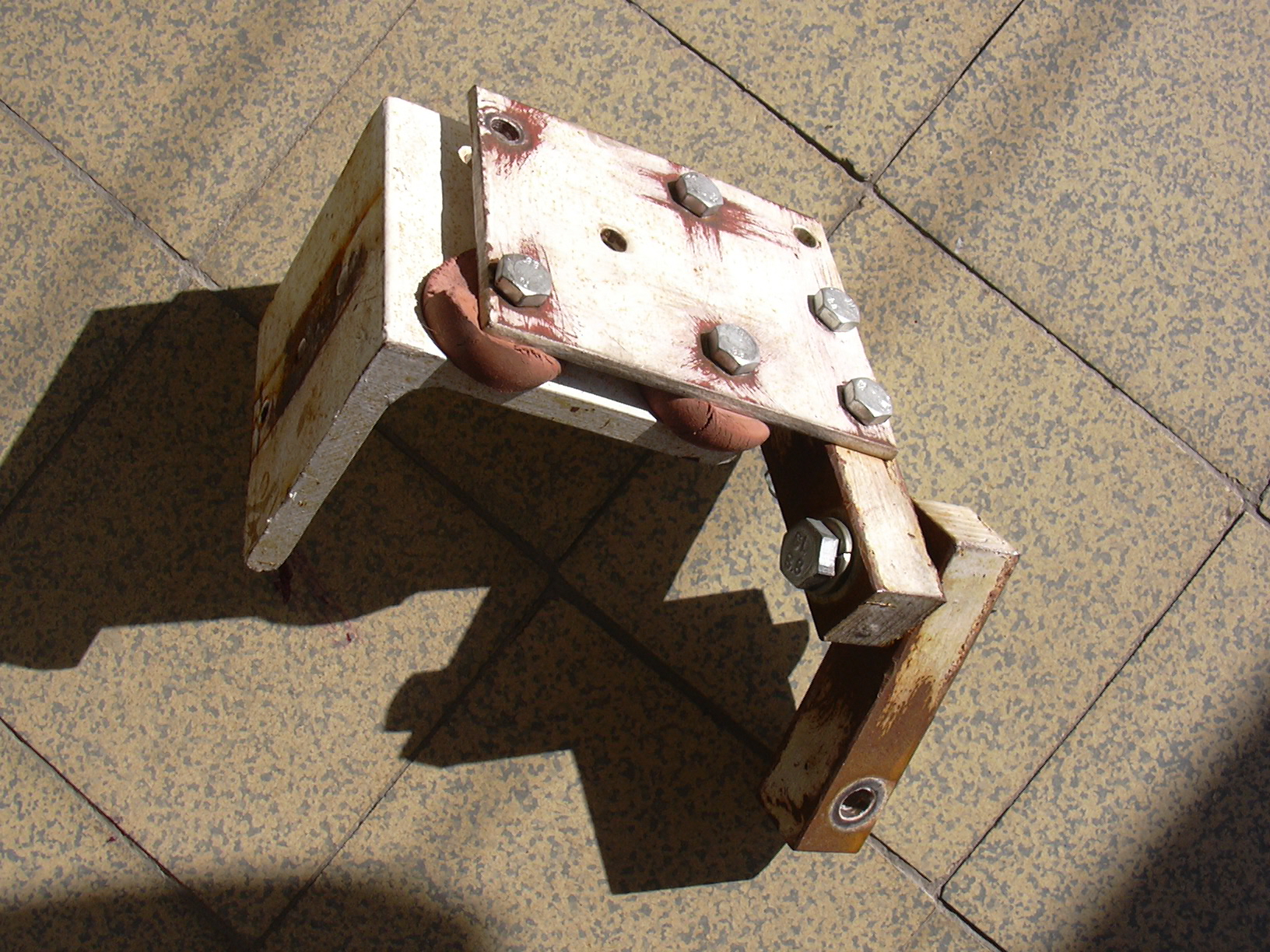
Three bolts preloaded with pink rubber blocks facilitate fine adjustment of the optical head direction with a gear ratio 1:300. The bolt on the right side is a part of a rough adjustment mechanism which allows pointing the optical head in needed direction.

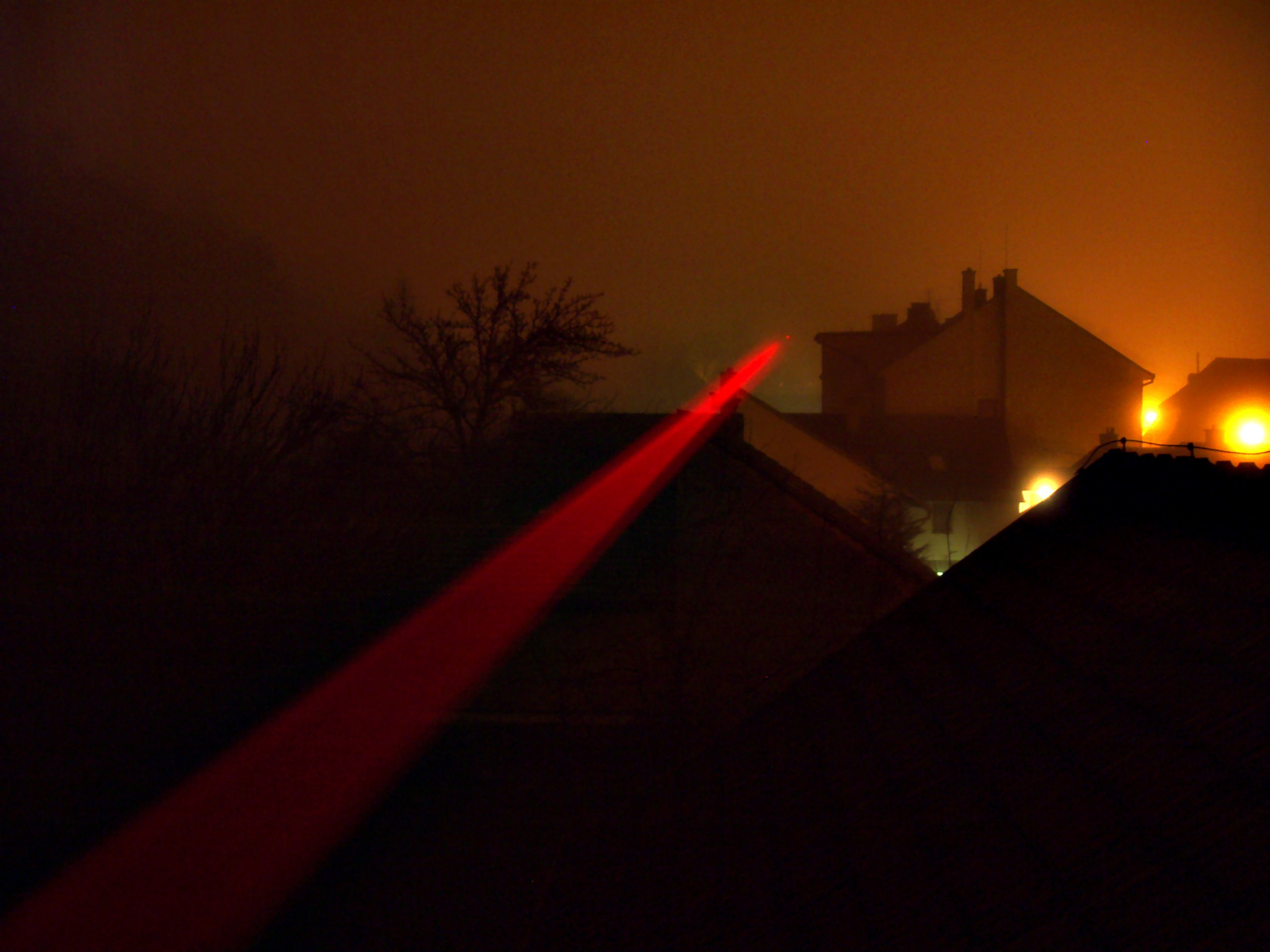
Artificially enhanced picture of fog interfering with a RONJA beam, compromising the connection by introducing interference

RONJA (Reasonable Optical Near Joint Access) is a free-space optical communication system developed in the Czech Republic by Karel Kulhavý of Twibright Labs. Released in 2001. It transmits data Wirelessly using beams of light. Ronja can be used to create a 10 Mbit/s full duplex Ethernet point-to-point link. It has been estimated that 1,000 to 2,000 links have been built worldwide.

The basic configuration has a range of 1.4 km (0.87 mi). The device consists of a receiver and transmitter pipe (optical head) mounted on a sturdy adjustable holder. Two coaxial cables are used to connect the rooftop installation with a protocol translator installed in the house near a computer or switch. By increasing the diameter of the lens and transmitter pipe diameter, the range can be extended to 1.9 km (1.2 mi).

Building instructions, blueprints, and schematics are published under the GNU Free Documentation License, with development using only free software tools. The author calls this approach "User Controlled Technology", emphasising their view on the importance of open-source and user-driven software and innovation

== Manufacture ==
The building instructions are very detailed, guiding the builder along the setup. Basic operations like drilling, soldering etc., are explained, along with all technical terms used. Several techniques – drilling templates, detailed checks after soldering, testing procedures – are employed to minimize errors at critical places and help to speed up work. Printed circuit boards are downloadable ready for manufacture, with instructions for a fabrication house (PCB manufacturer).

154 installations, located in multiple European countries and Brazil in South America have been registered into a gallery with partial descriptions, pictures and extra data.

== Range ==
With the brightest variant of Lumileds HPWT-BD00-F4000 LED and 130 mm diameter cheap magnifying glass lenses, the range is 1.4 km (0.87 mi). The dimmer but more affordable E4000 variant of HPWT-BD00 yields 1.3 kilometres (0.81 mi). The speed is always 10 Mbit/s full duplex regardless of the distance.

== Models ==
- Ronja Tetrapolis: Range of 1.4 km (0.87 mi), red visible light. Connect with 8P8C connector into a network card or switch.
- Ronja 10M Metropolis: Range of 1.4 km (0.87 mi), red visible light. Connects to Attachment Unit Interface.
- Ronja Inferno: Range of 1.25 km (0.78 mi), invisible infrared light.
- Ronja Benchpress: A measurement device for physical measurement of lens/LED combination gain and calculation of range from that
- Ronja Lopipe: The original (discontinued) design using red visible light and a RS232 interface for a max 115 kbit/s PPP/SLIP link.

== Limitations ==
As an FSO system it requires clear visibility between the transmitter and receiver. If the beam is obscured in a way that introduces too much noise or fully obstructs it, the link will stop working. Typically, problems may occur during conditions of snow or dense fog. One device weighs 15.5 kg (34 lb) and requires 70 hours of building time. It requires an ability to set full duplex manually on the network card or switch to take advantage of full duplex, since it doesn't support autonegotiation. Must be plugged directly into PC or switch using the integral 1 metre (3 ft 3 in) Ethernet cable.

== Technology ==
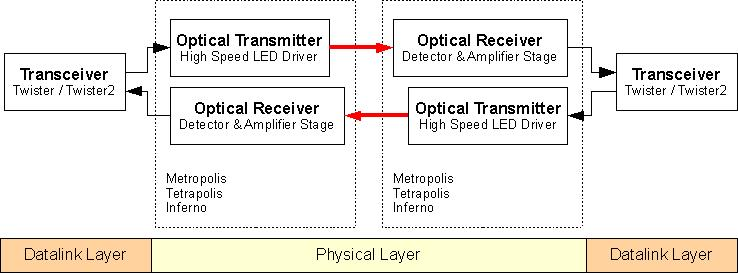
Block diagram of a full duplex RONJA system.

A complete RONJA system is made up of 2 transceivers: 2 optical transmitters and 2 optical receivers. They are assembled individually or as a combination. The complete system layout is shown in the block diagram.

=== Optical receiver – Preamplifier stage ===
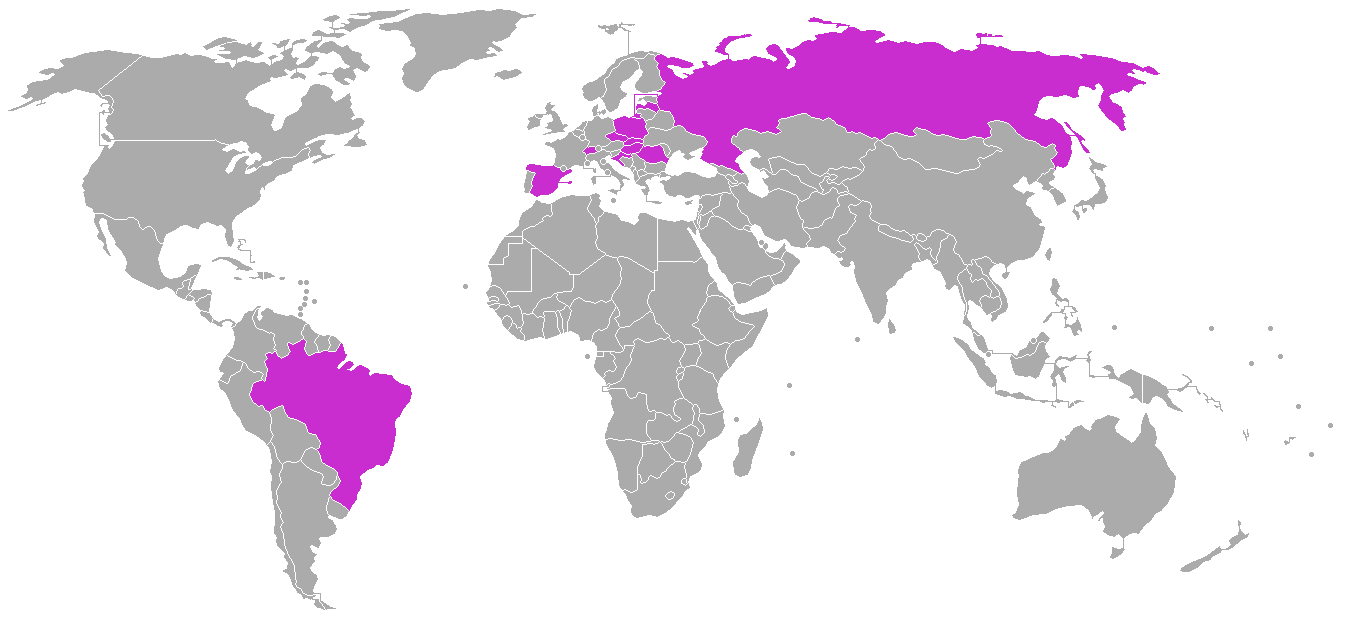
Map showing the distribution of the 153 registered installations of RONJA as of 1 October 2007. Based on data found at the official RONJA website

The usual approach in FSO (Free Space Optics) preamplifiers is to employ a transimpedance amplifier. A transimpedance amplifier is a very sensitive broadband high-speed device featuring a feedback loop. This fact means the layout is plagued with stability problems and special compensation of PIN diode capacitance must be performed, therefore this doesn't allow selection of a wide range of cheap PIN photodiodes with varying capacitances.

Ronja however uses a feedbackless design where the PIN has a high working electrical resistance (100 kilohms) which together with the total input capacitance (roughly 8 pF, 5 pF PIN and 3 pF input MOSFET cascode) makes the device operate with a passband on a 6 dB/oct slope of low pass formed by PIN working resistance and total input capacitance. The signal is then immediately amplified to remove the danger of contamination by signal noise, and then a compensation of the 6 dB/oct slope is done by derivator element on the programming pins of an NE592 video amplifier. A surprisingly flat characteristic is obtained. If the PIN diode is equipped with 3 kΩ working resistor to operate in flat band mode, the range is reduced to about 30% due to thermal noise from the 3 kΩ resistor.

=== Optical transmitter – Nebulus infrared LED driver ===
The HSDL4220 infrared LED is originally unsuitable for 10 Mbit/s operation. It has a bandwidth of 9 MHz, where 10 Mbit/s Manchester-modulated systems need bandwidth of around 16 MHz. Operation in a usual circuit with current drive would lead to substantial signal corruption and range reduction. Therefore, Twibright Labs developed a special driving technique consisting of driving the LED directly with 15-fold 74AC04 gate output in parallel with RF voltage applied current-unlimited directly to the LED through large capacitors. As the voltage to keep the nominal LED average current (100mA) varies with temperature and component tolerances, an AC-bypassed current sense resistor is put in series with the LED. A feedback loop measures voltage on this resistor and keeps it at a preset level by varying supply voltage of the 74AC04 gates. Therefore, the nominally digital 74AC04 is operating as a structured power CMOS switch completely in analog mode.

This way the LED junction is flooded and cleared of carriers as quickly as possible, basically by short circuit discharge. This pushes the speed of the LED to maximum, which makes the output optical signal fast enough so that the range/power ratio is the same as with the faster red HPWT-BD00-F4000 LED. The side effects of this brutal driving technique are: 1) the LED overshoots at the beginning of longer (5 MHz/1 MHz) impulses to about 2x brightness. This was measured to have no adverse effect on range. 2) A blocking ceramic capacitor bank backing up the 74AC04 switching array is crucial for correct operation, because charging and discharging the LED is done by short circuit. Under dimensioning this bank causes the leading and trailing edges of the optical output to grow longer.

=== Transceiver – Ronja Twister ===
Ronja Twister is an electronic interface for free space optical datalink based on counter and shift register chips. It is a part of the Ronja design. It is effectively an optical Ethernet transceiver without the optical drive part.

The original design has been superseded with Twister2 but the logic circuit remained the same.

== Open source hardware approach ==
Soderberg, studying Ronja sociologically, writes: "Arguably, the first project that vindicated the methods and licensing schemes of free software development, applied those practices to open hardware development, and pulled off a state-of-the-art technology without any backing from universities or firms, was the Ronja project."

The whole toolchain is built strictly upon free tools and the source files are provided, free, under the GPL. This allows anyone to enter the development, start manufacture or invest into the technology without entry costs. Such costs normally can include software licence costs, time investment into resolution of compatibility issues between proprietary applications, or costs of intellectual property licence negotiations. The decision to conceive the project this way was inspired by observed organizational efficiency of Free Software.

On Christmas 2001, Ronja became the world's first 10 Mbit/s Free Space Optics device with free sources.

Examples of tools used in development:

- gEDA gschem (Schematic capture)
- QCAD
- BRL-CAD
- The PCB program
- Sodipodi for Vector graphics

== See also ==
- Wireless community network
- Visible light communication
- List of device bandwidths
