= Optical wireless communications =

Use of visible, IR, or UV light to transmit a signal

Optical wireless communications (OWC) is a form of optical communication in which unguided light is used "in the air" (or in outer space), without an optical fiber. Visible, infrared (IR), or ultraviolet (UV) light is used to carry a Wireless signal. It is generally used in short-range communication; extensions exist for long-range and ultra-long range.

OWC systems operating in the visible band (390–750 nm) are commonly referred to as visible light communication (VLC). VLC systems take advantage of light-emitting diodes (LEDs) which can be pulsed at very high speeds without a noticeable effect on the lighting output and human eye. VLC can be possibly used in a wide range of applications including wireless local area networks, wireless personal area networks and vehicular networks, among others. On the other hand, terrestrial point-to-point OWC systems, also known as the free space optical (FSO) systems, operate at the near IR frequencies (750–1600 nm). These systems typically use laser transmitters and offer a cost-effective protocol-transparent link with high data rates, i.e., 10 Gbit/s per wavelength, and provide a potential solution for the backhaul bottleneck.

There has also been a growing interest in ultraviolet communication (UVC) as a result of recent progress in solid-state optical sources/detectors operating within solar-blind UV spectrum (200–280 nm). In this so-called deep UV band, solar radiation is negligible at the ground level and this makes possible the design of photon-counting detectors with wide field-of-view receivers that increase the received energy with little additional background noise. Such designs are particularly useful for outdoor non-line-of-sight configurations to support low-power short-range UVC such as in wireless sensors and ad-hoc networks.

== History ==
Wireless communications technologies proliferated and became essential very quickly during the last few decades of the 20th century, and the early 21st century. The wide-scale deployment of radio-frequency technologies was a key factor in the expansion of wireless devices and systems. However, the portion of the electromagnetic spectrum used by wireless systems is limited in capacity, and licenses to use parts of the spectrum are expensive. With the rise in data-heavy wireless communications, the demand for RF spectrum is outstripping supply, causing companies to consider options for using parts of the electromagnetic spectrum other than radio frequencies.

Optical wireless communication (OWC) refers to transmission in unguided propagation media through the use of optical carriers: visible, infrared (IR), and ultraviolet (UV) radiation. Signalling through beacon fires, smoke, ship flags and semaphore telegraph can be considered the historical forms of OWC. Sunlight has also been used for long-distance signaling since very early times. The earliest use of sunlight for communication purposes is attributed to ancient Greeks and Romans who used polished shields to send signals by reflecting sunlight during battles. In 1810, Carl Friedrich Gauss invented the heliograph which uses a pair of mirrors to direct a controlled beam of sunlight to a distant station. Although the original heliograph was designed for the geodetic survey, it was used extensively for military purposes during the late 19th and early 20th century. In 1880, Alexander Graham Bell invented the photophone, the world’s first wireless telephone system.

Military interest in photophones continued after Bell's time. For example, in 1935, the German Army developed a photophone where a tungsten filament lamp with an IR transmitting filter was used as a light source. Also, American and German military laboratories continued the development of high-pressure arc lamps for optical communication until the 1950s. Modern OWC uses either lasers or light-emitting diodes (LEDs) as transmitters. In 1962, MIT Lincoln Labs built an experimental OWC link using a light-emitting GaAs diode and was able to transmit TV signals over a distance of 30 miles. After the invention of the laser, OWC was envisioned to be the main deployment area for lasers and many trials were conducted using different types of lasers and modulation schemes. However, the results were in general disappointing due to the large divergence of laser beams and the inability to cope with atmospheric effects. With the development of low-loss fiber optics in the 1970s, they became the obvious choice for long distance optical transmission and shifted the focus away from OWC systems.

== Current status ==
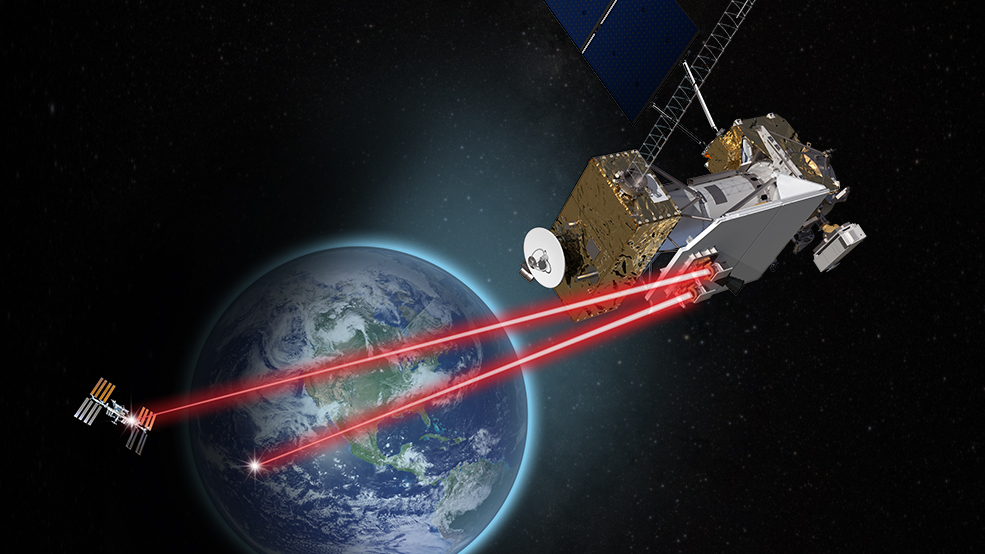
Illustration of the Laser Communications Relay Demonstration (LCRD) relaying data from ILLUMA-T on the International Space Station to a ground station on Earth.

Over the decades, interest in OWC was mainly limited to covert military applications, and space applications including inter-satellite and deep-space links. OWC’s mass market penetration has been so far limited with the exception of IrDA which is a wireless short-range transmission solution.

== Applications ==
Variations of OWC can be potentially employed in a diverse range of communication applications ranging from optical interconnects within integrated circuits through outdoor inter-building links to satellite communications.

OWC can be divided into five categories based on the transmission range:

1. Ultra-short range: chip-to-chip communications in stacked and closely packed multi-chip packages.
2. Short range: wireless body area network (WBAN) and wireless personal area network (WPAN) applications under standard IEEE 802.15.7, underwater communications.
3. Medium range: indoor IR and visible light communications (VLC) for wireless local area networks (WLANs) and inter-vehicular and vehicle-to-infrastructure communications.
4. Long range: inter-building connections, also called free-space optical communications (FSO).
5. Ultra-long range: Laser communication in space especially for inter-satellite links and establishment of satellite constellations.

== Recent trends ==
- In January 2015, IEEE 802.15 formed a Task Group to write a revision to IEEE 802.15.7-2011 that accommodates infrared and near ultraviolet wavelengths, in addition to visible light, and adds options such as Optical Camera Communications and LiFi.
- At long range OWC applications a 1 Gbit/s - 60 km range link between ground to aircraft at 800 km/h speed has been demonstrated, "Extreme Test for the ViaLight Laser Communication Terminal MLT-20 – Optical Downlink from a Jet Aircraft at 800 km/h", DLR and EADS December 2013.
- On consumer devices and short-range OWC applications on phones; Charge and receive data with light at your smartphone: TCL Communication/ALCATEL ONETOUCH and Sunpartner Technologies announces the first fully integrated solar smartphone. March 2014.
- On ultra-long range OWC applications the NASA’s Lunar Laser Communication Demonstration (LLCD) transmitted data from lunar orbit to Earth at a rate of 622 Megabits-per-second (Mbps), November 2013.
- The Next Generation of OWC / Visible Light Communications demonstrated 10 Mbit/s transmission with Polymer Light-Emitting Diodes or OLED.
- On OWC research activities there is a European research project action IC1101 OPTICWISE of the COST Programme (European Cooperation in Science and Technology) funded by the European Science Foundation, allowing the coordination of nationally funded research on a European level. The Action aims to serve as a high-profile consolidated European scientific platform for interdisciplinary optical wireless communication (OWC) research activities. It was launched in November 2011 and will run until November 2015. More than 20 countries represented.
- The consumer and industry OWC technologies adoption is represented by the Li-Fi Consortium, founded in 2011 is a Non-profit organization, devoted to introduce optical wireless technology. Promotes the adoption of Light Fidelity (Li-Fi) products.
- An example of Asian awareness about OWC is the VLCC visible light communication consortium in Japan, established at 2007 in order to realize safe, ubiquitous telecommunication system using visible light through the activities of market research, promotion, and standardization.
- In the USA there are several OWC initiatives, including the "Smart Lighting Engineering Research Center", founded in 2008 by the National Science Foundation (NSF) is a partnership of Rensselaer Polytechnic Institute (lead institution), Boston University and the University of New Mexico. Outreach partners are Howard University, Morgan State University, and Rose-Hulman Institute of Technology.
- In July 2023, the IEEE released 802.11bb, creating a standard for line-of-sight optical networking in the 800–1000 nm band

== See also ==
- Wireless data
