= Free-space optical communication =

Communication using light sent through free space

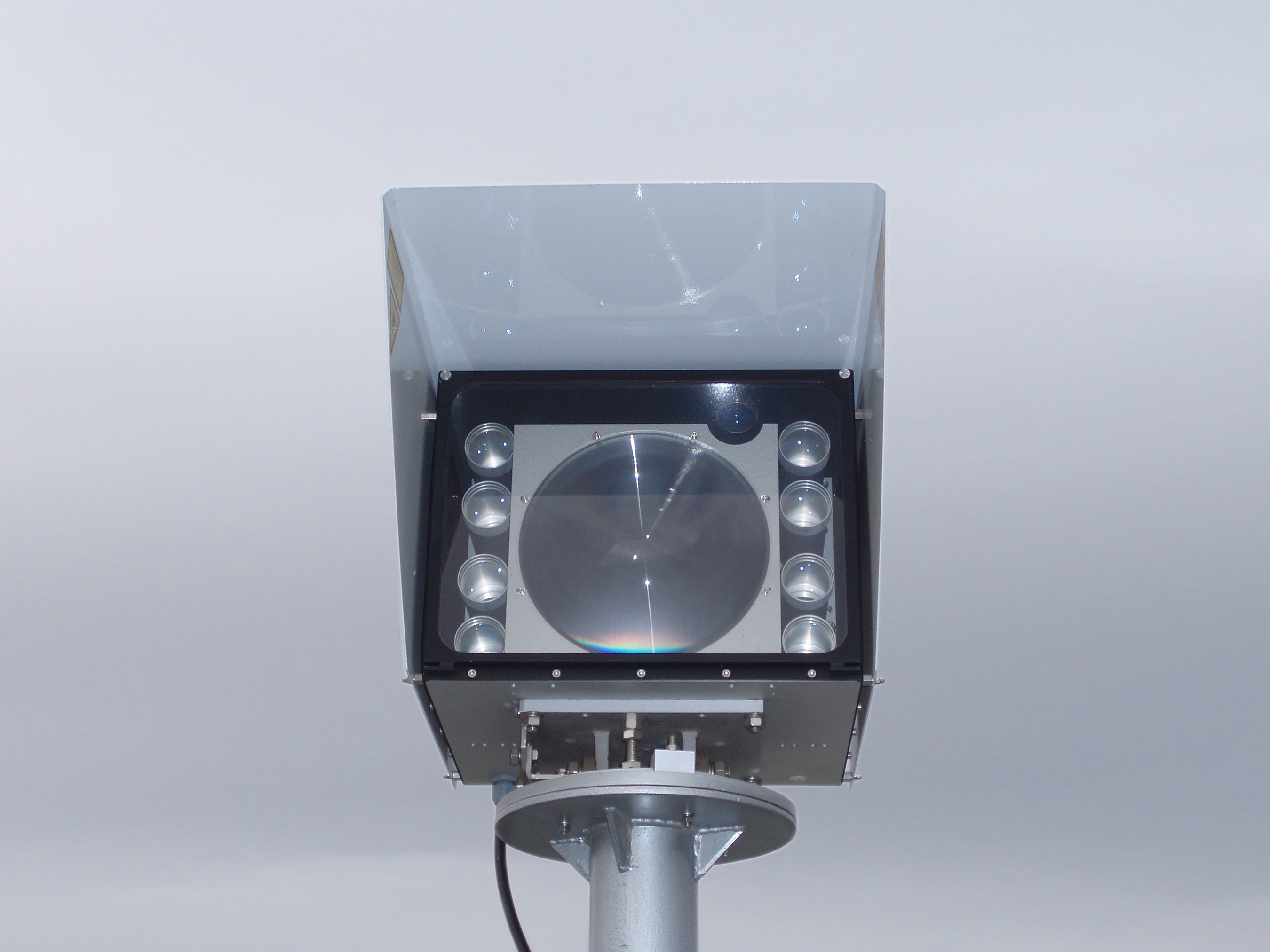
An eight-beam free-space–optics laser link, rated for 1 Gbit/s. The receptor is the large lens in the middle, the transmitters the smaller ones. At the top right corner is a monocular for assisting the alignment of the two heads.

Free-space optical communication (FSO) is an optical communication technology that uses light propagating in free space to wirelessly transmit data for telecommunications or computer networking over long distances. "Free space" means air, outer space, vacuum, or something similar. This contrasts with using solids such as optical fiber cable. The technology is useful where the physical connections are impractical due to high costs or other considerations.

== History ==
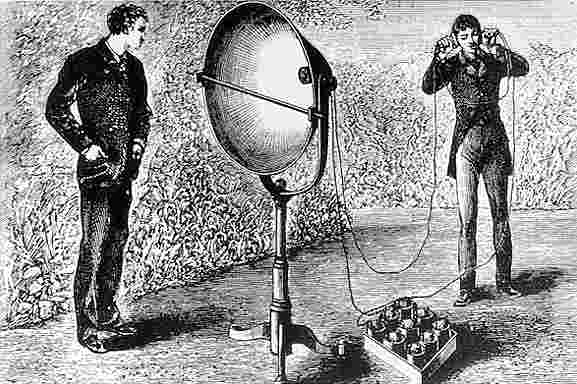
A photophone receiver and headset, one half of Bell and Tainter's optical telecommunication system of 1880

Optical communications, in various forms, have been used for thousands of years. The ancient Greeks used a coded alphabetic system of signalling with torches developed by Cleoxenus, Democleitus and Polybius. In the modern era, semaphores and wireless solar telegraphs called heliographs were developed, using coded signals to communicate with their recipients.

In 1880, Alexander Graham Bell and his assistant Charles Sumner Tainter created the photophone, at Bell's newly established Volta Laboratory in Washington, DC. Bell considered it his most important invention. The device allowed for the transmission of sound on a beam of light. On June 3, 1880, Bell conducted the world's first wireless telephone transmission between two buildings, some 213 meters (699 feet) apart.

Its first practical use came in military communication systems many decades later, first for optical telegraphy. German colonial troops used heliograph telegraphy transmitters during the Herero Wars starting in 1904, in German South-West Africa (today's Namibia) as did British, French, US or Ottoman signals.

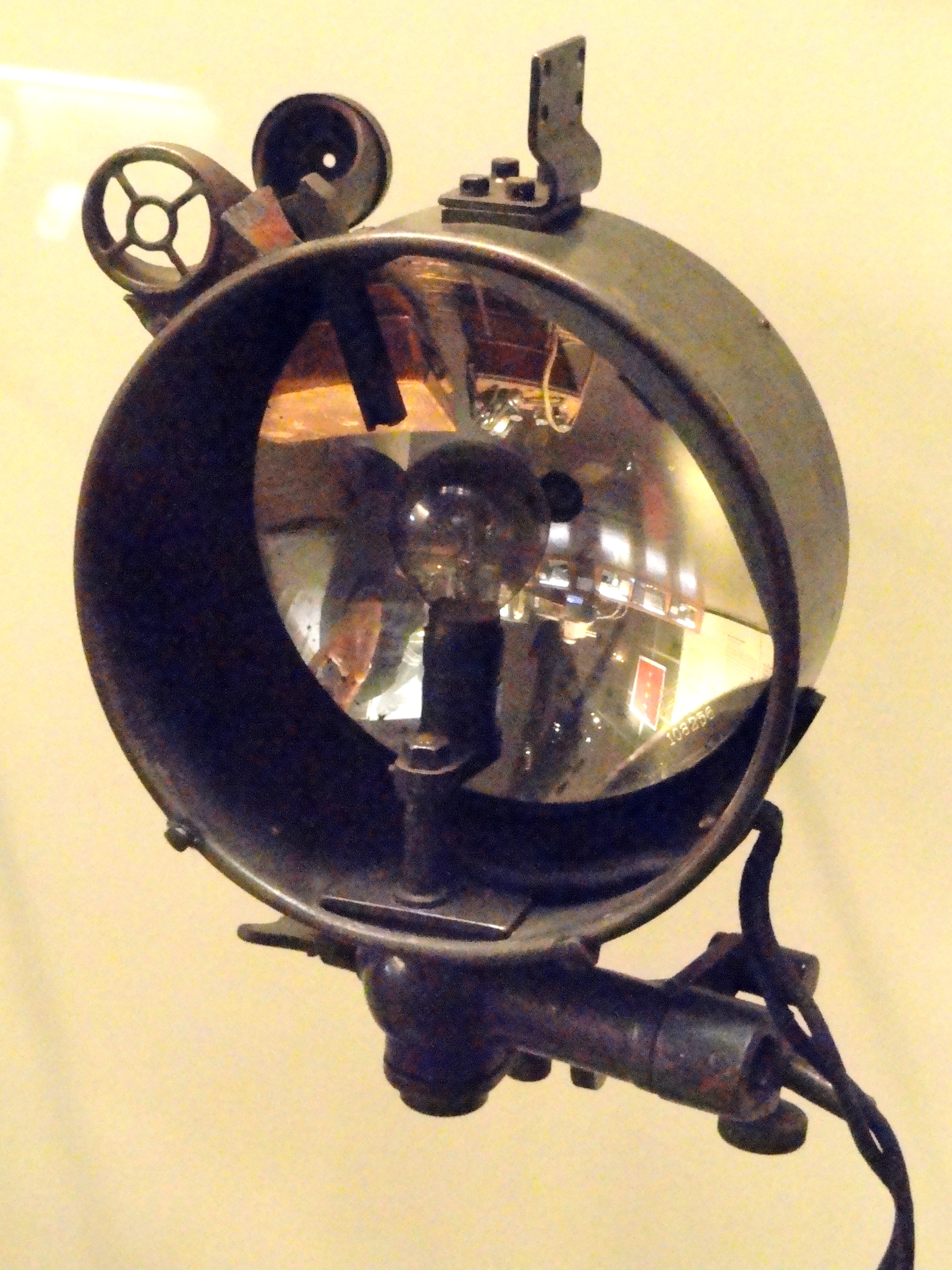
WW I German Blinkgerät

During the trench warfare of World War I when wire communications were often cut, German signals used three types of optical Morse transmitters called Blinkgerät, the intermediate type for distances of up to 4 km (2.5 mi) at daylight and of up to 8 km (5.0 mi) at night, using red filters for undetected communications. Optical telephone communications were tested at the end of the war, but not introduced at troop level. In addition, special blinkgeräts were used for communication with airplanes, balloons, and tanks, with varying success.

A major technological step was to replace the Morse code by modulating optical waves in speech transmission. Carl Zeiss, Jena developed the Lichtsprechgerät 80/80 (literal translation: optical speaking device) that the German army used in their World War II anti-aircraft defense units, or in bunkers at the Atlantic Wall.

The invention of lasers in the 1960s revolutionized free-space optics. Military organizations were particularly interested and boosted their development. In 1973, while prototyping the first laser printers at PARC, Gary Starkweather and others made a duplex 30 Mbit/s CAN optical link using astronomical telescopes and HeNe lasers to send data between offices; they chose the method due partly to less strict regulations (at the time) on free-space optical communication by the FCC. However, laser-based free-space optics lost market momentum when the installation of optical fiber networks for civilian uses was at its peak.

Many simple and inexpensive consumer remote controls use low-speed communication using infrared (IR) light. This is known as consumer IR technologies.

== Usage and technologies ==
Free-space point-to-point optical links can be implemented using infrared laser light, although low-data-rate communication over short distances is possible using LEDs. Infrared Data Association (IrDA) technology is a very simple form of free-space optical communications. On the communications side the FSO technology is considered as a part of the optical wireless communications applications. Free-space optics can be used for communications between spacecraft.

=== Useful distances ===
The reliability of FSO units has always been a problem for commercial telecommunications. Consistently, studies find too many dropped packets and signal errors over small ranges (400 to 500 meters (1,300 to 1,600 ft)). This is from both independent studies, such as in the Czech Republic, as well as internal studies, such as one conducted by MRV FSO staff.

Military based studies consistently produce longer estimates for reliability, projecting the maximum range for terrestrial links is of the order of 2 to 3 km (1.2 to 1.9 mi). All studies agree the stability and quality of the link is highly dependent on atmospheric factors such as rain, fog, dust and heat. Relays may be employed to extend the range for FSO communications.

TMEX USA ran two eight-mile links between Laredo, Texas and Nuevo Laredo, Mexico from 1998 to 2002. The links operated at 155 Mbit/s and reliably carried phone calls and internet service.

=== Extending the useful distance ===
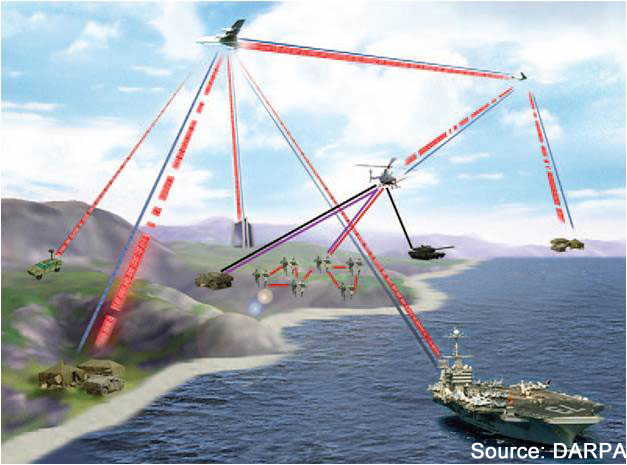
DARPA ORCA official concept art created c. 2008

The main reason terrestrial communications have been limited to non-commercial telecommunications functions is fog. Fog often prevents FSO laser links over 500 meters (1,600 ft) from achieving a year-round availability sufficient for commercial services. Several entities are continually attempting to overcome these key disadvantages to FSO communications and field a system with a better quality of service. DARPA has sponsored over US$130 million in research toward this effort, with the ORCA and ORCLE programs.

Other non-government groups are fielding tests to evaluate different technologies that some claim have the ability to address key FSO adoption challenges. As of October 2014, none have fielded a working system that addresses the most common atmospheric events.

FSO research from 1998 to 2006 in the private sector totaled $407.1 million, divided primarily among four start-up companies. All four failed to deliver products that would meet telecommunications quality and distance standards:

- Terabeam received approximately $575 million in funding from investors such as Softbank, Mobius Venture Capital and Oakhill Venture Partners. AT&T and Lucent backed this attempt. The work ultimately failed, and the company was purchased in 2004 for $52 million (excluding warrants and options) by Falls Church, Virginia-based YDI, effective June 22, 2004, and used the name Terabeam for the new entity. On September 4, 2007, Terabeam (then headquartered in San Jose, California) announced it would change its name to Proxim Wireless Corporation, and change its NASDAQ stock symbol from TRBM to PRXM.
- AirFiber received $96.1 million in funding, and never solved the weather issue. They sold out to MRV communications in 2003, and MRV sold their FSO units until 2012 when the end-of-life was abruptly announced for the Terescope series.
- LightPointe Communications received $76 million in start-up funds, and eventually reorganized to sell hybrid FSO-RF units to overcome the weather-based challenges.
- The Maxima Corporation published its operating theory in Science, and received $9 million in funding before permanently shutting down. No known spin-off or purchase followed this effort.
- Wireless Excellence developed and launched CableFree UNITY solutions that combine FSO with millimeter wave and radio technologies to extend distance, capacity and availability, with a goal of making FSO a more useful and practical technology.

One private company published a paper on November 20, 2014, claiming they had achieved commercial reliability (99.999% availability) in extreme fog. There is no indication this product is currently commercially available.

=== Extraterrestrial ===
The massive advantages of laser communication in space have multiple space agencies racing to develop a stable space communication platform, with many significant demonstrations and achievements.

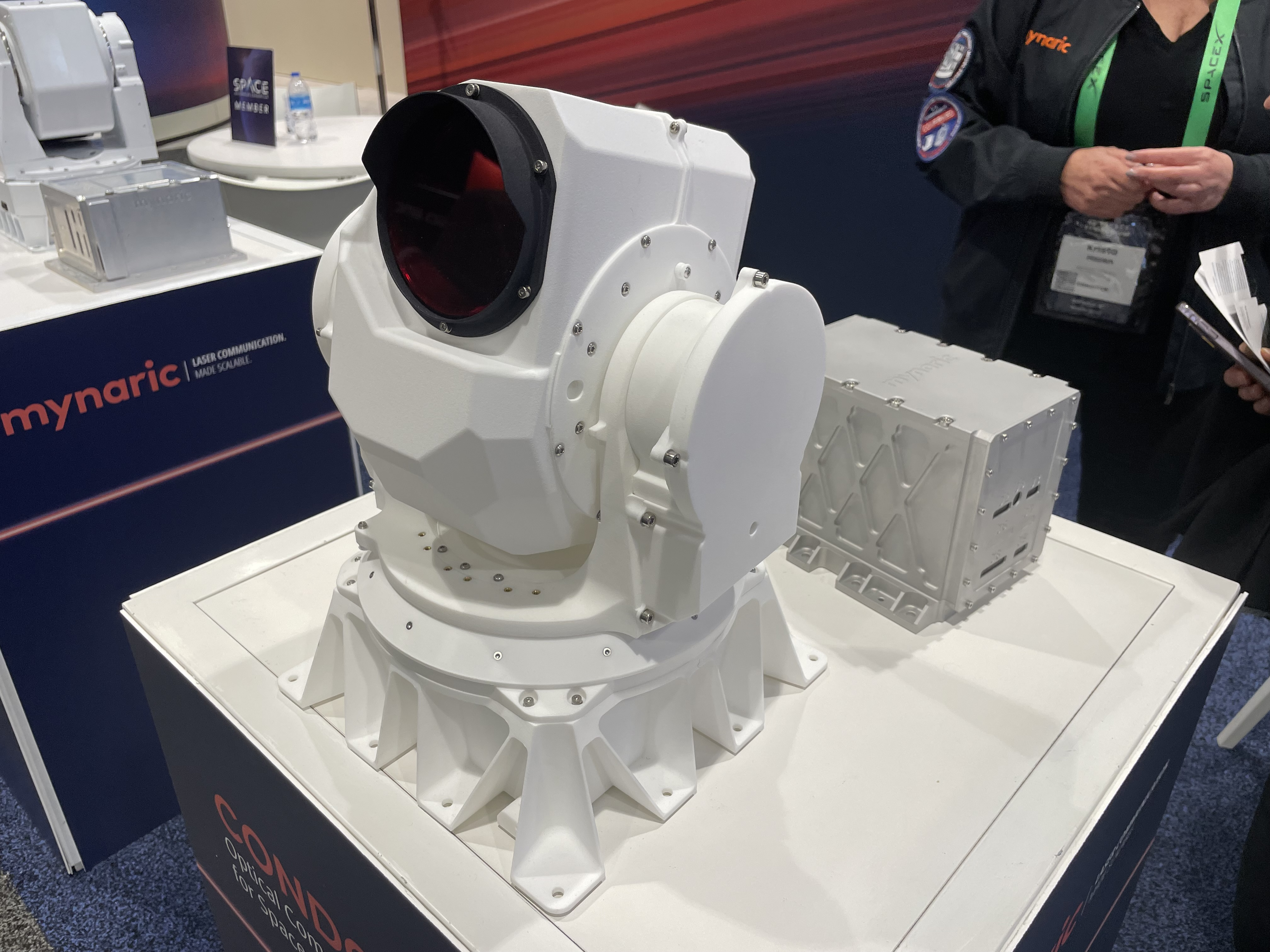
Mynaric-built terminal for satellite optical communications

==== Operational systems ====
The first gigabit laser-based communication was achieved by the European Space Agency and called the European Data Relay System (EDRS) on November 28, 2014. The system is operational and is being used on a daily basis.

In December 2023, the Australian National University (ANU) demonstrated its Quantum Optical Ground Station at its Mount Stromlo Observatory. QOGS uses adaptive optics and lasers as part of a telescope, to create a bi-directional communications system capable of supporting the NASA Artemis program to the Moon.

==== Demonstrations ====
A two-way distance record for communication was set by the Mercury laser altimeter instrument aboard the MESSENGER spacecraft. It was able to communicate across a distance of 24 million km (15 million mi), as the craft neared Earth on a fly-by in May 2005. The previous record had been set with a one-way detection of laser light from Earth by the Galileo probe, of 6 million km (3.7 million mi) in 1992.

In January 2013, NASA used lasers to beam an image of the Mona Lisa to the Lunar Reconnaissance Orbiter roughly 390,000 km (240,000 mi) away. To compensate for atmospheric interference, an error correction code algorithm similar to that used in CDs was implemented.

In the early morning hours of October 18, 2013, NASA's Lunar Laser Communication Demonstration (LLCD) transmitted data from lunar orbit to Earth at a rate of 622 megabits per second (Mbit/s). LLCD was flown aboard the Lunar Atmosphere and Dust Environment Explorer (LADEE) spacecraft, whose primary science mission was to investigate the tenuous and exotic atmosphere that exists around the Moon.

Between April and July 2014 NASA's OPALS instrument successfully uploaded 175 megabytes in 3.5 seconds and downloaded 200–300 MB in 20 s. Their system was also able to re-acquire tracking after the signal was lost due to cloud cover.

On December 7, 2021 NASA launched the Laser Communications Relay Demonstration (LCRD), which aims to relay data between spacecraft in geosynchronous orbit and ground stations. LCRD is NASA's first two-way, end-to-end optical relay. LCRD uses two ground stations, Optical Ground Station (OGS)-1 and -2, at Table Mountain Observatory in California, and Haleakalā, Hawaii. One of LCRD's first operational users is the Integrated LCRD Low-Earth Orbit User Modem and Amplifier Terminal (ILLUMA-T), on the International Space Station. The terminal will receive high-resolution science data from experiments and instruments on board the space station and then transfer this data to LCRD, which will then transmit it to a ground station. After the data arrives on Earth, it will be delivered to mission operation centers and mission scientists. The ILLUMA-T payload was sent to the ISS in late 2023 on SpaceX CRS-29, and achieved first light on December 5, 2023.

On April 28, 2023, NASA and its partners achieved 200 gigabit per second (Gbit/s) throughput on a space-to-ground optical link between a satellite in orbit and Earth. This was achieved by the TeraByte InfraRed Delivery (TBIRD) system, mounted on NASA's Pathfinder Technology Demonstrator 3 (PTD-3) satellite.

==== Commercial use ====
Various satellite constellations that are intended to provide global broadband coverage, such as SpaceX Starlink, employ laser communication for inter-satellite links. This effectively creates a space-based optical mesh network between the satellites.

== LEDs ==
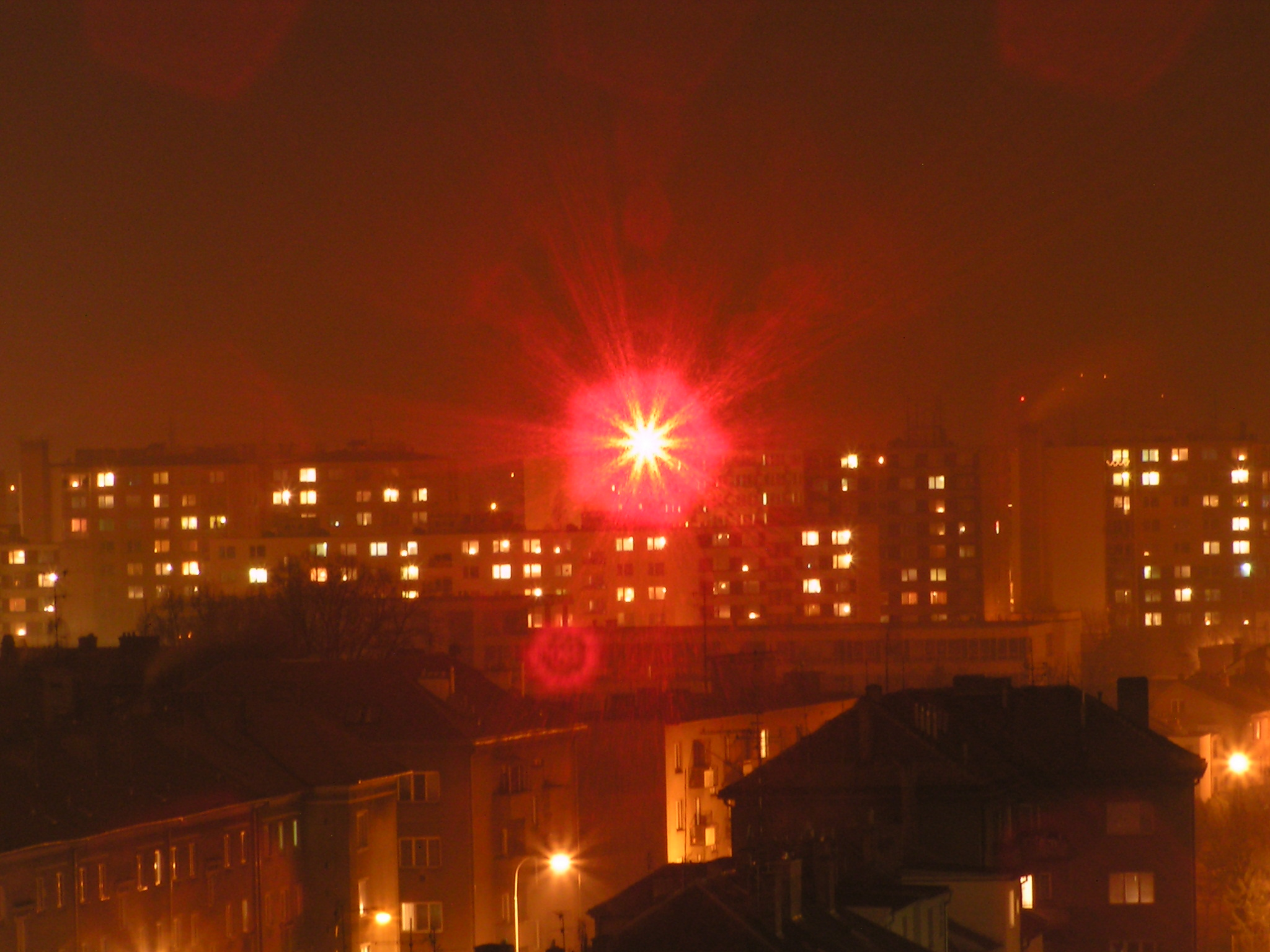
RONJA is a free implementation of FSO using high-intensity LEDs.

In 2001, Twibright Labs released RONJA Metropolis, an open-source DIY 10 Mbit/s full-duplex LED FSO system that can span 1.4 km (0.87 mi).

In 2004, a visible light communication consortium was formed in Japan. This was based on work from researchers that used a white LED-based space lighting system for indoor local area network (LAN) communications. These systems present advantages over traditional UHF RF-based systems from improved isolation between systems, the size and cost of receivers/transmitters, RF licensing laws and by combining space lighting and communication into the same system. In January 2009, a task force for visible light communication was formed by the Institute of Electrical and Electronics Engineers working group for wireless personal area network standards known as IEEE 802.15.7. A trial was announced in 2010, in St. Cloud, Minnesota.

Amateur radio operators have achieved significantly farther distances using incoherent sources of light from high-intensity LEDs. One reported 278 km (173 mi) in 2007. However, physical limitations of the equipment used limited bandwidths to about 4 kHz. The high sensitivities required of the detector to cover such distances made the internal capacitance of the photodiode used a dominant factor in the high-impedance amplifier which followed it, thus naturally forming a low-pass filter with a cut-off frequency in the 4 kHz range. Lasers can reach very high data rates which are comparable to fiber communications.

Projected data rates and future data rate claims vary. A low-cost white LED (GaN-phosphor) which could be used for space lighting can typically be modulated up to 20 MHz. Data rates of over 100 Mbit/s can be achieved using efficient modulation schemes and Siemens claimed to have achieved over 500 Mbit/s in 2010. Research published in 2009, used a similar system for traffic control of automated vehicles with LED traffic lights.

In September 2013, pureLiFi, the Edinburgh start-up working on Li-Fi, also demonstrated high speed point-to-point connectivity using any off-the-shelf LED light bulb. In previous work, high bandwidth specialist LEDs have been used to achieve the high data rates. The new system, the Li-1st, maximizes the available optical bandwidth for any LED device, thereby reducing the cost and improving the performance of deploying indoor FSO systems.

== Engineering details ==
Typically, the best scenarios for using this technology are:

- LAN-to-LAN connections on campuses at Fast Ethernet or Gigabit Ethernet speeds
- LAN-to-LAN connections in a city, a metropolitan area network
- To cross a public road or other barriers which the sender and receiver do not own
- Speedy service delivery of high-bandwidth access to optical fiber networks
- Converged voice-data connection
- Temporary network installation (for events or other purposes)
- Reestablish high-speed connection quickly (disaster recovery)
- As an alternative or add-on to existing wireless technologies
  - Especially powerful in combination with automatic aiming systems, in moving vehicles
- As a safety add-on for important fiber connections (redundancy)
- For communications between spacecraft, including elements of a satellite constellation
- For inter- and intra-chip communication

The light beam can be very narrow, which makes FSO hard to intercept, improving security. Encryption can secure the data traversing the link. FSO provides vastly improved electromagnetic interference (EMI) behavior compared to using microwaves.

=== Technical advantages ===
- Ease of deployment
- Can be used to power devices
- License-free long-range operation (in contrast with radio communication)
- High bit rates
- Low bit error rates
- Immunity to electromagnetic interference
- Full-duplex operation
- Protocol transparency
- Increased security when working with narrow beam(s)
- No Fresnel zone necessary
- Reference open source implementation
- Reduced size, weight, and power consumption compared to RF antennas

=== Range-limiting factors ===
For terrestrial applications, the principal limiting factors are:

- Fog (10 to ~100 dB/km attenuation)
- Beam dispersion
- Atmospheric absorption
- Rain
- Snow
- Terrestrial scintillation
- Interference from background light sources (including the sun)
- Shadowing
- Pointing stability in wind
- Pollution, such as smog

These factors cause an attenuated receiver signal and lead to higher bit error ratio (BER). To overcome these issues, vendors found some solutions, like multi-beam or multi-path architectures, which use more than one sender and more than one receiver. Some state-of-the-art devices also have larger fade margin (extra power, reserved for rain, smog, fog). To keep an eye-safe environment, good FSO systems have a limited laser power density and support laser classes 1 or 1M. Atmospheric and fog attenuation, which are exponential in nature, limit practical range of FSO devices to several kilometers. However, free-space optics based on 1550 nm wavelength, have considerably lower optical loss than free-space optics using 830 nm wavelength, in dense fog conditions. FSO using wavelength 1550 nm system are capable of transmitting several times higher power than systems with 850 nm and are safe to the human eye (1M class). Additionally, some free-space optics, such as EC SYSTEM, ensure higher connection reliability in bad weather conditions by constantly monitoring link quality to regulate laser diode transmission power with built-in automatic gain control.

== See also ==
- Atomic line filter#Laser tracking and communication
- Extremely high frequency
- KORUZA
- Laser safety
- Mie scattering
- Modulating retro-reflector
- N-slit interferometer
- Optical window
- Radio window
- Rayleigh scattering
- Free-space path loss
