= List of BITS Pilani alumni =

This is a list of notable alumni of BITS Pilani.

Mathew Cherian is currently the Global Ambassador of Ageing and was the former CEO of Helpage India for two decades and a Trustee of Helpage international.

from the BITS 1975 batch of Pilani an engineer by training who moved in to the social sector . Has been involved with the High level Committee of forming the CSR policy in India and on the CSR committee of CII.

Is involved as chair of SAGE a social venture fund of The Ministry of Social Justice and Empowerment. And with the Department of Science and Technology for technology interventions with the disabled and elderly.

Was awarded the Outstanding Alumni award of BITS Pilani for Social innovation and leadership at the convocation in 2016 . Recipient of the Vayoshreshta Samman for life time work with the elderly from Govt of India .

== Entrepreneurs ==
Name	Achievement	Year of Attendance at BITS
Sanjay Mehrotra	Co-founder of SanDisk, CEO of Micron Technology	1974-1976
Preetish Nijhawan	Co-founder of Akamai Technologies	1985–1989
Baba Kalyani	Billionaire, Chairman of Bharat Forge	1965–1970
Sabeer Bhatia	Founder of Hotmail	1986–1988
Vinod Agarwal	Founder and chairman of SemIndia; founder and former Chairman of LogicVision	1968–1973
Vijay Chandru	Co-founder and CEO, Strand Life Sciences; Inventor of Simputer	1971–1975
Rajiv Bapna	Founder and Director of Amkette, a storage media company	1969–1974
Surendra Kumar Surana	Founder and Managing Director of Compucom Software Ltd and Editor in Chief at Jan TV	1981–1985

== Corporate leaders ==
Name	Achievement	Year of Attendance at BITS
Amitabh Chaudhry	MD & CEO of Axis Bank	1981–1985
Revathi Advaithi	CEO of Flex	1986–1990
Rakesh Kapoor	ex-CEO of Reckitt Benckiser	1975–1980
Sunil Duggal	ex-CEO of Dabur	1974–1979
Vivek Paul	ex-CEO of Wipro Technologies; Consulting Professor at Stanford University	
SK Roongta	ex-Chairman of Steel Authority of India	1966–1971

== Academia ==
Name	Achievement	Year of Attendance at BITS
Goverdhan Mehta	Padma Shri Awardee, Fellow of the Royal Society, ex-Director of IISc Bangalore, ex-Vice Chancellor of University of Hyderabad	–1963
Dorairajan Balasubramanian	Former President of Indian Academy of Sciences and Director of Research at L. V. Prasad Eye Institute; recipient of the National Order of Merit (France) and Padma Shri.	1957–1959
S. P. Kothari	Padma Shri Awardee, Dean of MIT Sloan School of Management	1974–1979
Krishna Saraswat	Electrical Engineering Professor at Stanford University	1963–1968
Milind Tambe	Gordon McKay Professor of Computer Science at Harvard University	–1986
Autar Kaw	Professor of Mechanical Engineering at the University of South Florida	1976–1981
Arun Sharma	Distinguished emeritus professor, Queensland University of Technology	2008
G. Ravindra Kumar	Senior professor - Tata Institute of Fundamental Research	1977–1983
Ravi Gomatam	Director of Bhaktivedanta Institute (Berkeley and Mumbai)	
Narendra Ahuja	Founding Director of IIIT Hyderabad (1999–2002)	1968–1972
Arun K. Somani	Department Chair, Senior Associate Dean in Engineering, Iowa State University	–1973
Govindan Rangarajan	Director & Professor Dept. of Mathematics, Indian Institute of Science, Bangalore	1980–1985
Ravindra Dastikop	Educator and speaker on Cloud Computing	

== Social activists, politics, and government ==
Name	Achievement	Year of Attendance at BITS
Prithviraj Chavan	Former Chief Minister of Maharashtra; former Union Minister for Science and Technology, Govt. of India	1963–1967
C. V. Ananda Bose	22nd Governor of West Bengal	

== Film ==
Name	Achievement	Year of Attendance at BITS
Mani Shankar	Film director	–1978
Anu Hasan	Actress, Tamil/Telugu movies, TV show host	1988–1993
Baradwaj Rangan	Film critic and writer	1988–1992
Kaniha	Former Actress, Malayalam/Tamil/Kannada/Telugu films, TV show host	1999-2003
Anu Menon	Film director and screenwriter	
Sandeep A. Varma	Award-winning Film Director and Writer	
Idlebrain Jeevi	Film critic and entrepreneur	1991-1995
Siva Ananth	Film writer, producer, lyricist, director and actor	1991-1995

== Arts ==
Name	Achievement	Year of Attendance at BITS
B. Sandhya	Police officer and author	
Dilip D'Souza	Writer of social causes	1976–1981
Shashi Warrier	Writer of fiction	
Vikram Sampath	Writer of historical non-fiction	
Hartosh Singh Bal	Journalist and Editor	
AK Srikanth	Writer of fiction, screenplay writer, film-maker	1986 - 1991
Padmini Chettur	Dancer	1987–1991
Dushyanth Sridhar	Noted scholar in Sanskrit and Tamil on ancient Hindu scriptures	2004–2009
Gaurav Chaudhary	Tech Vlogger	
Harish Sivaramakrishnan	Lead vocalist of Carnatic progressive rock band Agam	1998–2002
