= Digital media player =

Device for storage, playback, or viewing of digital media

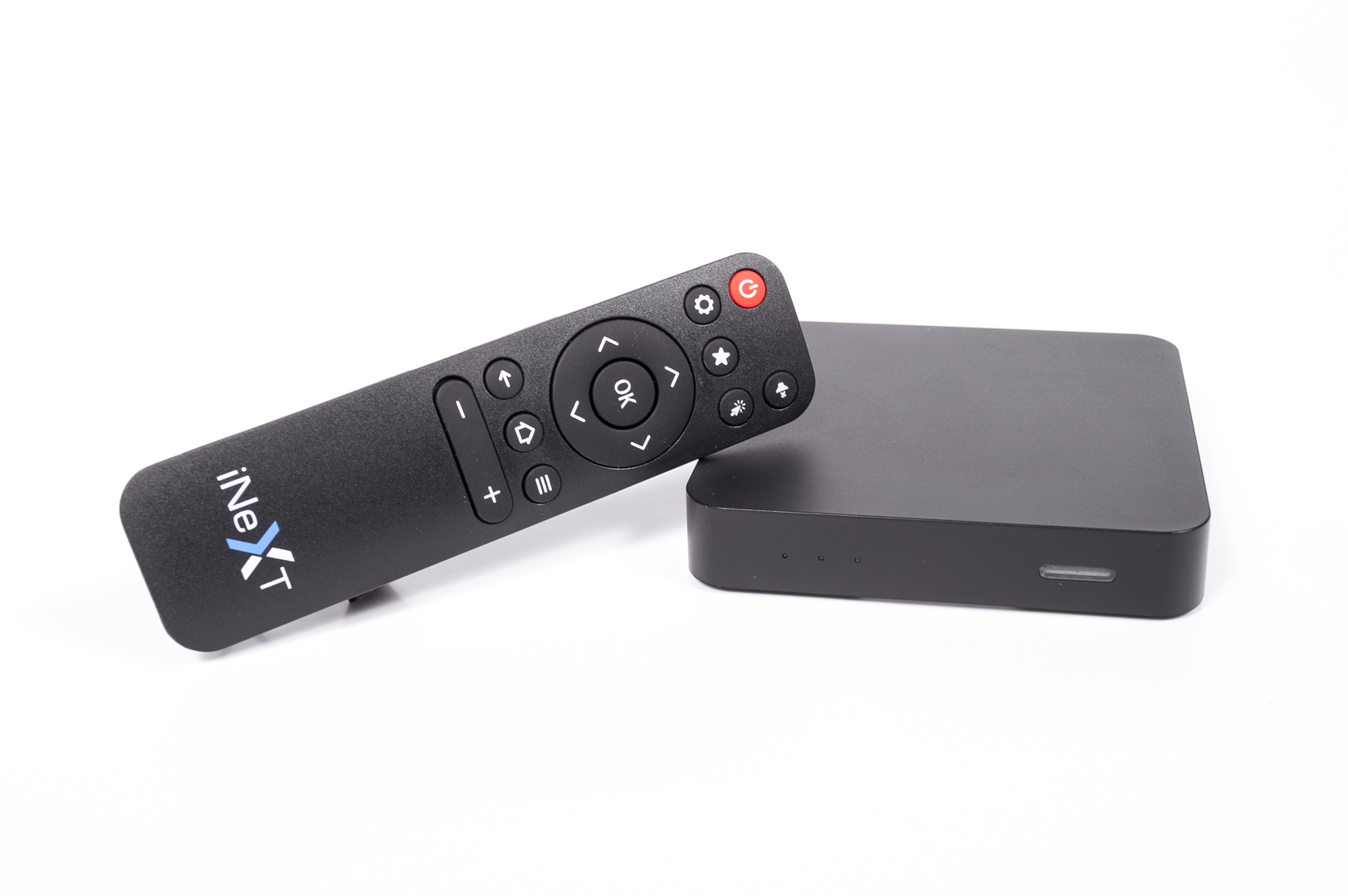
A digital media player in the form of a set-top box, pictured with its remote control

A digital media player (also known as a streaming device or streaming box) is a type of consumer electronics device designed for the storage, playback, or viewing of digital media content. They are typically designed to be integrated into a home cinema configuration and attached to a television or AV receiver or both.

The term is most synonymous with devices designed primarily for the consumption of content from streaming media services such as internet video, including over-the-top content services such as subscription video on demand, and free ad-supported streaming television (FAST) services. These devices usually have a compact form factor (either as a compact set-top box, or a dongle designed to plug into an HDMI port) and contain a 10-foot user interface with support for a remote control and, in some cases, voice commands, as control schemes. Some services may support remote control on digital media players using their respective mobile apps, while Google's Chromecast ecosystem was initially designed around integration with the mobile apps of content services.

A digital media player's operating system may provide a search engine for locating content available across multiple services and installed apps. Many digital media players offer internal access to digital distribution platforms, where users can download or purchase content such as films, television episodes, and apps. In addition to internet sources, digital media players may support the playback of content from other sources, such as external media (including USB drives or memory cards), or streamed from a computer or media server. Some digital media players may also support video games, though their complexity (which can range from casual games to ports of larger games) depends on operating system and hardware support, and, besides those marketed as microconsoles, are not usually promoted as the device's main function.

Digital media players do not usually include a tuner for receiving terrestrial television, nor disc drives for Blu-ray disc or DVD. Some devices, such as standalone Blu-ray players, may include similar functions to digital media players (often in a reduced form), as well as recent generations of video game consoles, while smart TVs integrate similar functions into the television itself. Some TV makers have, in turn, licensed operating system platforms from digital media players as middleware for their smart TVs—such as Android TV, Amazon Fire TV, and Roku—which typically provide a similar user experience to their standalone counterparts, but with TV-specific features and settings reflected in their user experience.

== Overview ==
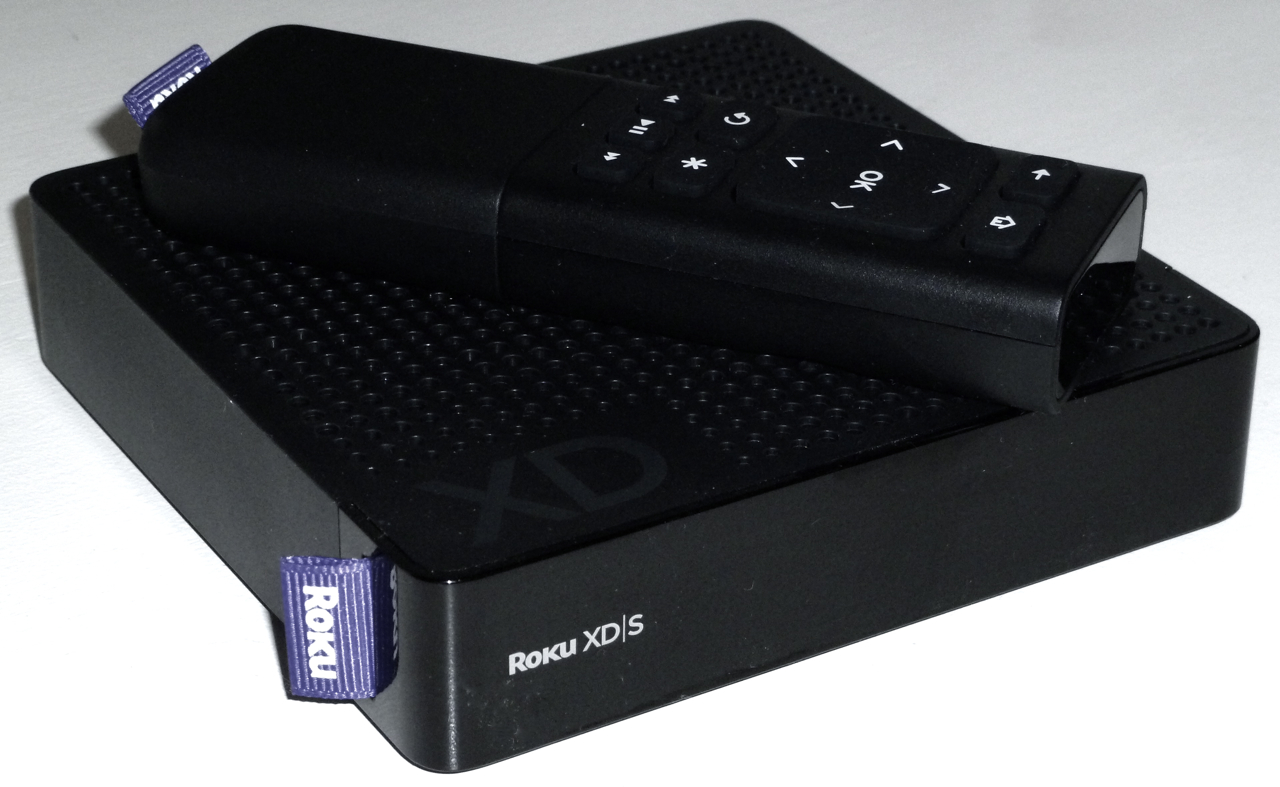
Roku is a popular brand of digital media players.

In the 2010s, with the popularity of portable media players and digital cameras, as well as fast Internet download speeds and relatively cheap mass storage, many people came into possession of large collections of digital media files that cannot be played on a conventional analog HiFi without connecting a computer to an amplifier or television. The means to play these files on a network-connected digital media player that is permanently connected to a television is seen as a convenience. The rapid growth in the availability of online content has made it easier for consumers to use these devices and obtain content. YouTube, for instance, is a common plug-in available on most networked devices. Netflix has also struck deals with many consumer-electronics makers to make their interface available in the device's menus for their streaming subscribers. This symbiotic relationship between Netflix and consumer electronics makers has helped propel Netflix to become the largest subscription video service in the U.S. as of 2011 using up to 20% of U.S. bandwidth at peak times.

Media players are often designed for compactness and affordability and tend to have small or non-existent hardware displays other than simple LED lights to indicate whether the device is powered on. Interface navigation on the television is usually done with an infrared remote control, while more advanced digital media players come with high-performance remote controls that allow control of the interface using integrated touch sensors. Some remotes also include accelerometers for air mouse features, which allow basic motion gaming. Most digital media player devices are unable to play physical audio or video media directly and instead require a user to convert these media into playable digital files using a separate computer and software. They are also usually incapable of recording audio or video. In the 2010s, it is also common to find digital media player functionality integrated into other consumer-electronics appliances, such as DVD players, set-top boxes, smart TVs, or even video game consoles.

== Terminology ==
Digital media players are also commonly referred to as a digital media extender, digital media streamer, digital media hub, digital media adapter, or digital media receiver (which should not be confused with AV receiver).

Digital media player manufacturers use a variety of names to describe their devices. Some more commonly used alternative names include:

- Connected DVD
- Connected media player
- Digital audio receiver
- Digital media adapter
- Digital media connect
- Digital media extender
- Digital media hub
- Digital media player
- Digital media streamer
- Digital media receiver
- Digital media renderer
- Digital video receiver
- Digital video streamer
- HD Media Player
- HDD media player
- Media Extender
- Media Regulator
- Network-connected media player
- Network-connected media player
- Network media player
- Networked Digital Video Disc
- Networked entertainment gateway
- OTT player
- Over-the-Top player
- Smart Television media player
- Smart Television player
- Streaming media box
- Streaming media player
- Streaming video player
- Wireless Media Adapter
- YouTube Player Support

== History ==
By November 2000, an audio-only digital media player was demonstrated by a company called SimpleDevices, which was awarded two patents covering this invention in 2006. Developed under the SimpleFi name by Motorola in late 2001, the design was based on a Cirrus Arm-7 processor and the wireless HomeRF networking standard which pre-dated 802.11b in the residential markets. Other early market entrants in 2001 included the Turtle Beach AudioTron, Rio Receiver and SliMP3 digital media players. An early version of a video-capable digital media player was presented by F.C. Jeng et al. in the International Conf. on Consumer Electronics in 2002. It included a network interface card, a media processor for audio and video decoding, an analog video encoder (for video playback to a TV), an audio digital-to-analog converter for audio playback, and an IR (infrared receiver) for remote-control interface.

A concept of a digital media player was also introduced by Intel in 2002 at the Intel Developer Forum as part of their Extended Wireless PC Initiative. Intel's digital media player was based on an Xscale PXA210 processor and supported 802.11b wireless networking. Intel was among the first to use the Linux embedded operating system and UPnP technology for its digital media player. Networked audio and DVD players were among the first consumer devices to integrate digital media player functionality. Examples include the Philips Streamium-range of products that allowed for remote streaming of audio, the GoVideo D2730 Networked DVD player, which integrated DVD playback with the capability to stream Rhapsody audio from a PC, and the Buffalo LinkTheater, which combined a DVD player with a digital media player. More recently, the Xbox 360 gaming console from Microsoft was among the first gaming devices that integrated a digital media player. With the Xbox 360, Microsoft also introduced the concept of a Windows Media Center Extender, which allows users to access the Media Center capabilities of a PC remotely, through a home network. More recently, Linksys, D-Link, and HP introduced the latest generation of digital media players that support 720p and 1080p high-resolution video playback and may integrate both Windows Extender and traditional digital media player functionality.

== Typical features ==
A digital media player can connect to the home network using either a wireless (IEEE 802.11a, b, g, and n) or wired Ethernet connection. Digital media players include a user interface that allows users to navigate through their digital media library, search for and play back media files. Some digital media players only handle music; some handle music and pictures; some handle music, pictures, and video; while others go further to allow internet browsing or controlling Live TV from a PC with a TV tuner.

Some other capabilities which are accomplished by digital media players include:

- Play, catalog, and store local hard disk, flash drive, or memory card music CDs and view CD album art, view digital photos, and watch DVD and Blu-ray or other videos.
- Stream movies, music, photos (media) over the wired or wireless network using technologies like DLNA
- View digital pictures (one by one or as picture slideshows)
- Stream online video to a TV from services such as Netflix and YouTube.
- Play video games.
- Browse the Web, check email and access social networking services through downloadable Internet applications.
- Video conference by connecting a webcam and microphone.

In the 2010s, there were stand-alone digital media players on the market from AC Ryan, Asus, Apple (e.g., Apple TV), NetGear (e.g., NTV and NeoTV models), Dune, iOmega, Logitech, Pivos Group, Micca, Sybas (Popcorn Hour), Amkette EvoTV, D-Link, EZfetch, Fire TV, Android TV, Pinnacle, Xtreamer, and Roku, just to name a few. The models change frequently, so it is advisable to visit their websites for current model names.

=== Processors ===
These devices come with low power consumption processors or SoC (System on Chip) and are most commonly either based on MIPS or ARM architecture processors combined with integrated DSP GPU in a SoC (or MPSoC) package. They also include RAM-memory and some type of built-in type of non-volatile computer memory (Flash memory).

=== Internal hard-drive capabilities ===
HD media player or HDD media player (HDMP) is a consumer product that combines digital media player with a hard drive (HD) enclosure with all the hardware and software for playing audio, video and photos to a television. All these can play computer-based media files on a television without the need for a separate computer or network connection, and some can even be used as a conventional external hard drive. These types of digital media players are sometimes sold as empty shells to allow the user to fit their own choice of hard drive (some can manage unlimited hard disk capacity and other only a certain capacity, i.e. 1TB, 2TB, 3TB, or 4TB), and the same model is sometimes sold with or without an internal hard drive already fitted.

=== Formats, resolutions and file systems ===
Digital media players can usually play H.264 (SD and HD), MPEG-4 Part 2 (SD and HD), MPEG-1, MPEG-2 .mpg, MPEG-2 .TS, VOB and ISO images video, with PCM, MP3 and AC3 audio tracks. They can also display images (such as JPEG and PNG) and play music files (such as FLAC, MP3 and Ogg).

=== Operating system ===
While most media players have traditionally been running proprietary or open source software frameworks versions based on Linux as their operating systems, many newer network-connected media players are based on the Android platform which gives them an advantage in terms of applications and games from the Google Play store. Even without Android, some digital media players still have the ability to run applications (sometimes available via an app store), interactive on-demand media, personalized communications, and social networking features.

== Connections ==
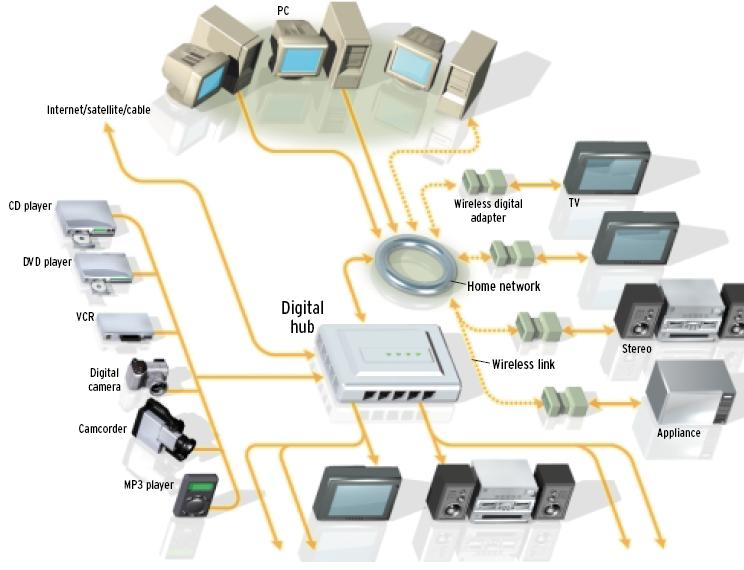
An example of a digital media player in a network

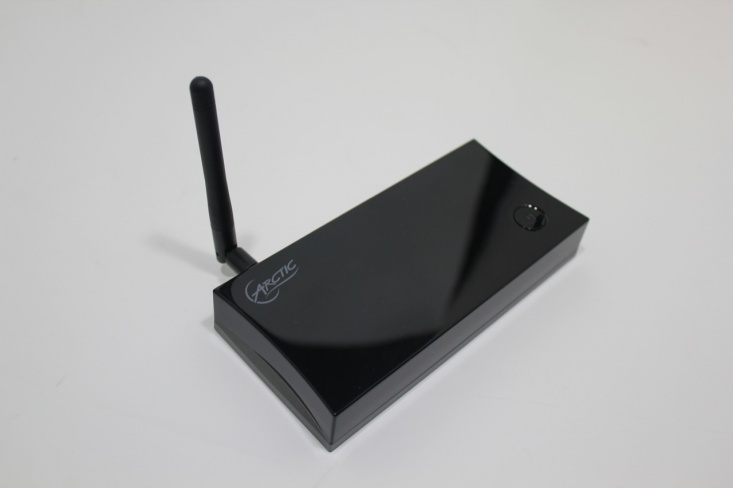
A wireless media extender from Arctic for music streaming and multi-room entertainment

There are two ways to connect an extender to its central media server - wired or wireless.

=== Streaming and communication protocols ===
While early digital media players used proprietary communication protocols to interface with media servers, today most digital media players either use standard-based protocols such SMB/CIFS/SAMBA or NFS or rely on some version of UPnP (Universal Plug and Play) and DLNA (Digital Living Network Alliance) standards. DLNA-compliant digital media players and Media Servers are meant to guarantee a minimum set of functionality and proper interoperability among digital media players and servers, regardless of the manufacturer, but unfortunately, not every manufacturer follows the standards perfectly, which can lead to incompatibility.

=== Media server ===
Some digital media players will only connect to specific media server software installed on a PC to stream music, pictures and recorded or live TV originating from the computer. Apple iTunes can, for example, be used this way with the Apple TV hardware that connects to a TV. Apple has developed a tightly integrated device and content management ecosystem with their iTunes Store, personal computers, iOS devices, and the Apple TV digital media receiver. The most recent version of the Apple TV has lost the hard-drive that was included in its predecessor and fully depends on either streaming internet content, or another computer on the home network for media.

=== Connection ports ===
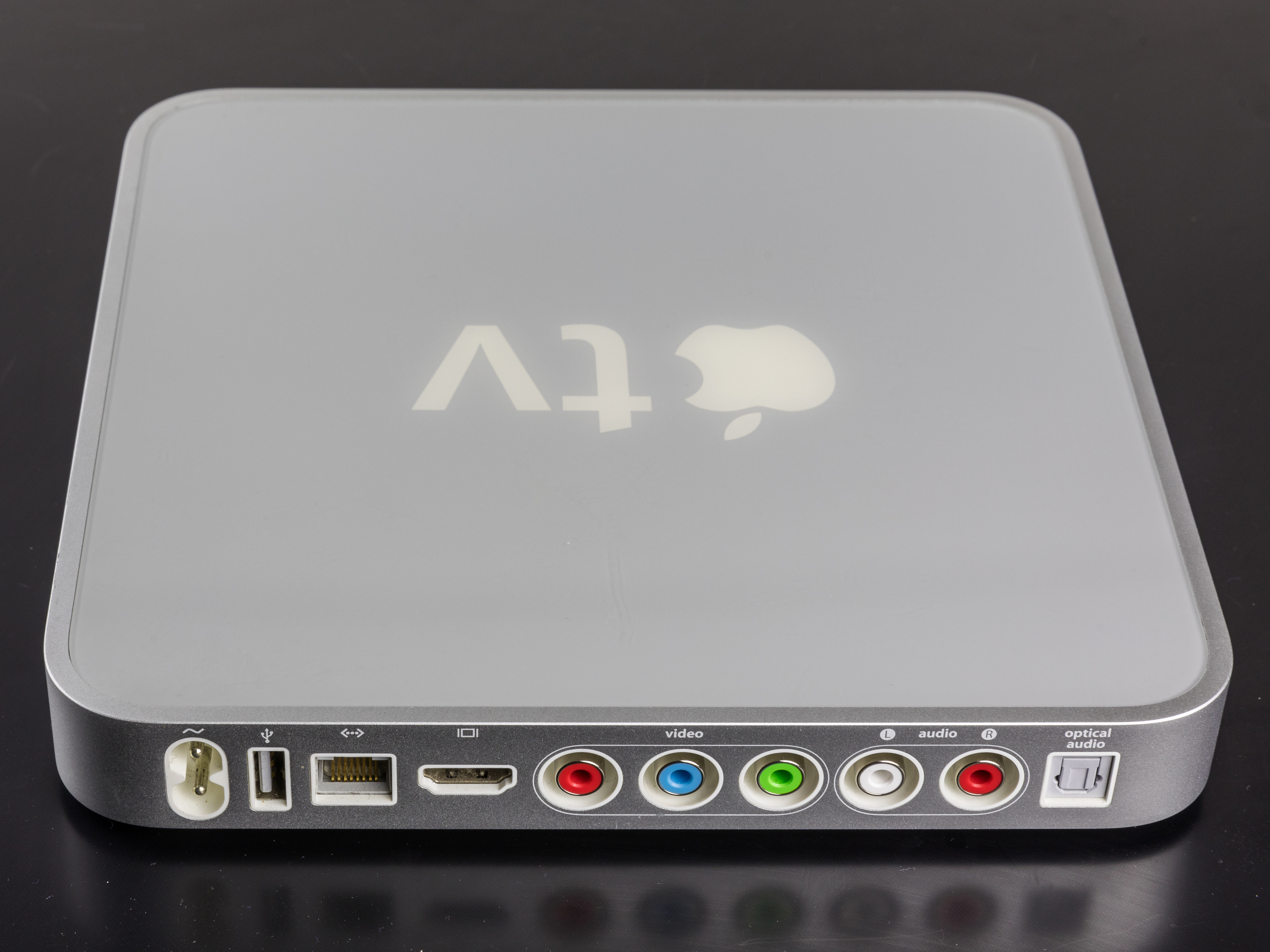
Back of first-generation Apple TV

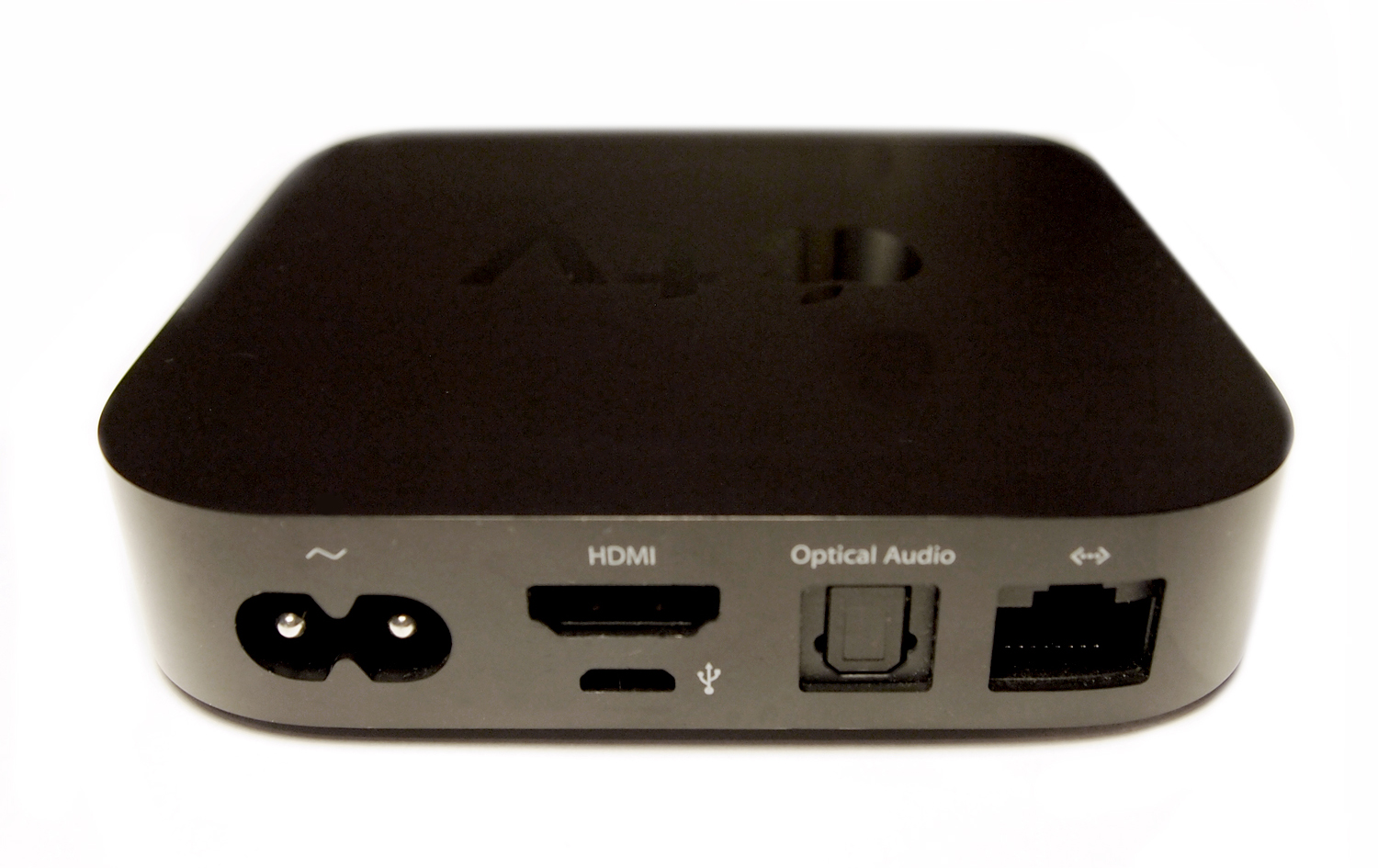
Back of second- and third-generation Apple TV

Television connection is usually done via; composite, SCART, Component, HDMI video, with Optical Audio (TOSLINK/SPDIF), and connecting to the local network and broadband internet using either a wired Ethernet or a wireless Wi-Fi connection, and some also have built-in Bluetooth support for remotes and gamepads or joysticks. Some players come with USB (USB 2.0 or USB 3.0) ports, which allow local media content playback.

== Use ==
=== Market impact on traditional television services ===
The convergence of content, technology, and broadband access allows consumers to stream television shows and movies to their high-definition televisions in competition with pay television providers. The research company SNL Kagan expects 12 million households, roughly 10%, to go without cable, satellite or telco video service by 2015 using Over The Top services. This represents a new trend in the broadcast television industry, as the list of options for watching movies and TV over the Internet grows at a rapid pace. Research also shows that even as traditional television service providers are trimming their customer base, they are adding Broadband Internet customers. Nearly 76.6 million U.S. households get broadband from leading cable and telephone companies, although only a portion have sufficient speeds to support quality video steaming. Convergence devices for home entertainment will likely play a much larger role in the future of broadcast television, effectively shifting traditional revenue streams while providing consumers with more options.

According to a 2012 report from the researcher NPD In-Stat, only about 12 million U.S. households had either Web-capable TVs or digital media players connected to the Internet, although In-Stat estimated about 25 million U.S. TV households owned a set with the built-in network capability. Also, In-Stat predicted that 100 million homes in North America and western Europe would own digital media players and television sets that blend traditional programs with Internet content by 2016.

=== Use for illegal streaming ===
Since at least 2015, dealers have marketed digital media players, often running the Android operating system and branded as being "fully-loaded", that are promoted as offering free streaming access to copyrighted media content, including films and television programs, as well as live feeds of television channels. These players are commonly bundled with the open source media player software Kodi, which is in turn pre-loaded with plug-ins enabling access to services streaming this content without the permission of their respective copyright holders. These "fully-loaded" set-top boxes are often sold through online marketplaces such as Amazon.com and eBay, as well as local retailers. The spread of these players has been attributed to their low cost and ease of use, with user experiences similar to legal subscription services such as Netflix.

"Fully-loaded" set-top boxes have been subject to legal controversies, especially noting that their user experiences made them accessible to end-users who may not always realize that they are actually streaming pirated content. In the United Kingdom, the Federation Against Copyright Theft (FACT) has taken court actions on behalf of rightsholders against those who market digital media players pre-loaded with access to copyrighted content. In January 2017, an individual seller plead not guilty to charges of marketing and distributing devices that circumvent technological protection measures. In March 2017, the High Court of Justice ruled that BT Group, Sky plc, TalkTalk, and Virgin Media must block servers that had been used on such set-top boxes to illegally stream Premier League football games. Later in the month, Amazon UK banned the sale of "certain media players" that had been pre-loaded with software to illegally stream copyrighted content. On 26 April 2017, the European Court of Justice ruled that the distribution of set-top boxes with access to unauthorized streams of copyrighted works violated the exclusive rights to communicate them to the public. In September 2017, a British seller of such boxes pled guilty to violations of the Copyright, Designs and Patents Act for selling devices that can circumvent effective technical protection measures.

In Canada, it was initially believed that these set-top boxes fell within a legal grey area, as the transient nature of streaming content did not necessarily mean that the content was being downloaded in violation of Canadian copyright law. However, on 1 June 2016, a consortium of Canadian media companies (BCE Inc., Rogers Communications, and Videotron) obtained a temporary federal injunction against five retailers of Android-based set-top boxes, alleging that their continued sale were causing "irreparable harm" to their television businesses, and that the devices' primary purpose were to facilitate copyright infringement. The court rejected an argument by one of the defendants, who stated that they were only marketing a hardware device with publicly available software, ruling that the defendants were "deliberately encourag[ing] consumers and potential clients to circumvent authorized ways of accessing content." 11 additional defendants were subsequently added to the suit. The lawyer of one of the defendants argued that retailers should not be responsible for the actions of their users, as any type of computing device could theoretically be used for legal or illegal purposes. In April 2017, the Federal Court of Appeal blocked an appeal requesting that the injunction be lifted pending the outcome of the case.

Although the software is free to use, the developers of Kodi have not endorsed any add-on or Kodi-powered device intended for facilitating copyright infringement. Nathan Betzen, president of the XBMC Foundation (the non-profit organization which oversees the development of the Kodi software), argued that the reputation of Kodi had been harmed by third-party retailers who "make a quick buck modifying Kodi, installing broken piracy add-ons, advertising that Kodi lets you watch free movies and TV, and then vanishing when the user buys the box and finds out that the add-on they were sold on was a crummy, constantly breaking mess." Betzen stated that the XBMC Foundation was willing to enforce its trademarks against those who use them to promote Kodi-based products which facilitate copyright infringement.

Following a lawsuit by Dish Network against TVAddons, a website that offered streaming add-ons that were often used with Kodi and on such devices, in June 2017, the group shut down its add-ons and website. A technology analyst speculated that the service could eventually reappear under a different name in the future, as have torrent trackers. In June, the service's operator was also sued by the Bell/Rogers/Videotron consortium for inducing copyright infringement.

In June 2017, Televisa was granted a court order banning the sale of all Roku products in Mexico, as it was alleged that third parties had been operating subscription television services for the devices that contain unlicensed content. The content is streamed through unofficial apps that are added to the devices through hacking. Roku objected to the allegations, stating that these services were not certified by the company or part of its official Channels platform, whose terms of service require that they have rights to stream the content that they offer. Roku also stated that it actively cooperates with reports of channels that infringe copyrights. The ruling was overturned in October 2018 after Roku took additional steps to remove channels with unauthorized content from the platform.

In May 2018, the Federal Communications Commission sent letters to the CEOs of Amazon.com and eBay, asking for their help in removing such devices from their marketplaces. The letter cited malware risks, fraudulent use of FCC certification marks, and how their distribution through major online marketplaces may incorrectly suggest that they are legal and legitimate products.

In Saudi Arabia, the practice of using digital media players for pirated television content first became popular during the Qatar diplomatic crisis, after Qatari pay television network beIN Sports was banned from doing business in the country. The pirate subscription television service BeoutQ operated a satellite television service featuring repackaged versions of the beIN Sports channels, but its Android-based satellite boxes also included a pre-loaded app store offering apps for multiple streaming and subscription services dealing primarily in copyrighted media.

In the United States, resellers sell Chinese-made Android TV IPTV set-top boxes under the brands SuperBox and vSeeBox.

== See also ==
- Comparison of digital media players
- Cord-cutting
- Digital Living Network Alliance
- Digital video recorder
- List of smart TV platforms
- Second screen
- Streaming media
- System on a chip
- Tivoization
- Tekpix
