= G. Ravindra Kumar =

Indian laser physicist and professor

- Born: 15 June 1961 (age 65); Andhra Pradesh, India
- Education: BITS Pilani; IIT Kanpur
- Known for: Studies on Ultrashort pulse and Warm dense matter
- Awards: 2000 B. M. Birla Science Prize; 2003 Shanti Swarup Bhatnagar Prize; 2005 Salute Mumbai Award; 2006 DAE-SRC Outstanding Research Investigator Award; 2015 Infosys Prize
- Scientific career
- Fields: Plasma physics; Optical physics
- Workplaces: Tata Institute of Fundamental Research

Gattamraju Ravindra Kumar (born 15 June 1961) is an Indian laser physicist and a senior professor of Nuclear and Atomic Physics at Tata Institute of Fundamental Research. Known for his research on Ultrashort pulse and Warm dense matter, Kumar is an elected fellow of the Indian Academy of Sciences and the Indian National Science Academy. The Council of Scientific and Industrial Research, the apex agency of the Government of India for scientific research, awarded him the Shanti Swarup Bhatnagar Prize for Science and Technology, one of the highest Indian science awards, for his contributions to physical sciences in 2003. (Note: Long link - please select award year to see details) He is also a recipient of the B. M. Birla Science Prize and Infosys Prize.

== Biography ==
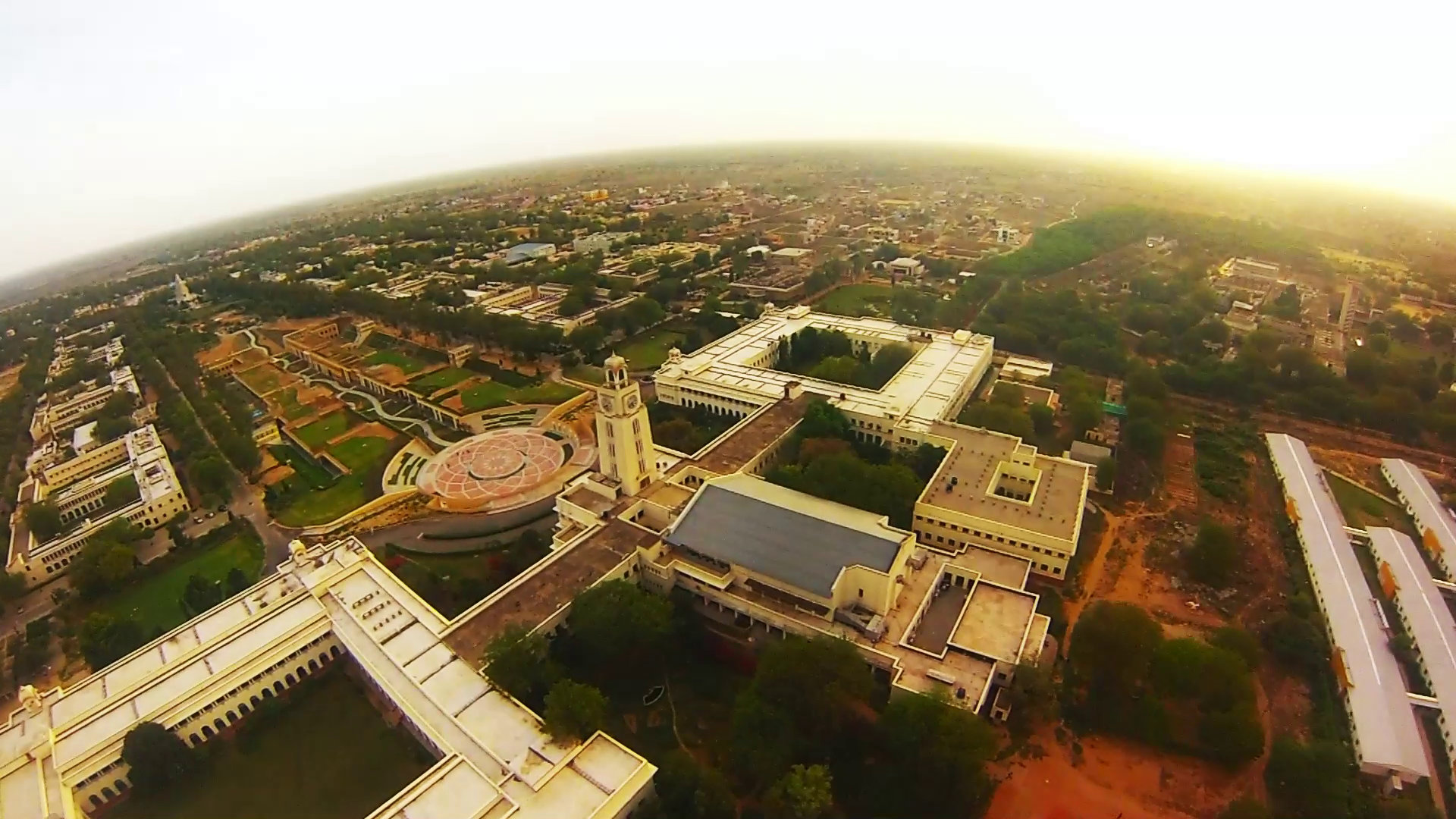
Aerial View BITS Pilani

Born on 15 June 1961, Ravindra Kumar did his B.E. (Hons) in Mechanical Engineering from BITS Pilani, and continued there to earn an M.Sc. (Hons) in Physics in 1983. Subsequently, he enrolled for doctoral studies at the Indian Institute of Technology, Kanpur from where he secured a PhD in 1990. His post-doctoral work was also at IIT Kanpur and in 1992, he joined Tata Institute of Fundamental Research where he is a senior professor of the Department of Nuclear and Atomic Physics, heading UPHILL (Ultra-short Laser Pulse High Intensity Laser Laboratory.

== Legacy ==
Kumar is known to have established UPHILL (Ultra-short Laser Pulse High Intensity Laser Laboratory), a centre for advanced laser experiments at Tata Institute of Fundamental Research. Here, he heads a group of scholars and researchers who are involved in studies related to laser-matter interactions. He is reported to have worked on the generation of megagauss magnetic pulses using ultrafast laser pulses and his group observed the turbulent magnetic fields created by instabilities of the high current electron beams driven by the laser pulse for the first time. Nanoparticle coated surfaces and pendular states of molecules are two of the other areas of his research. His studies have been documented by way of a number of articles (Note: Please see Selected bibliography section) and the online article repository of the Indian Academy of Sciences has listed 75 of them. He has also guided a number of students in their doctoral studies. He is a member of the Optical Society of America and sits in the International Committee on Ultra-High Intensity Lasers of the International Union of Pure and Applied Physics. He is also a life member of Indian Society for Mass Spectrometry, Indian Society of Atomic and Molecular Physics, Plasma Science Society of India and Indian Laser Association. Plenary or invited lectures delivered by him include the lecture on Extreme Light, Extreme States of Infosys Science Foundation in March 2016.

== Awards and honors ==
Ravindra Kumar was awarded the B. M. Birla Science Prize by B. M. Birla Science Centre in 2000. The Council of Scientific and Industrial Research awarded him the Shanti Swarup Bhatnagar Prize, one of the highest Indian science awards in 2003. The Indian Academy of Sciences elected him as a fellow in 2004 and he received the Salute Mumbai Award in 2005. The Department of Atomic Energy honored his work during the period between 2006 and 2011 with DAE-SRC Outstanding Research Investigator Award and the elected fellowship of the Indian National Science Academy reached him in 2008. The Infosys Science Foundation presented the Infosys Prize to him in 2015. In 2017, Kumar became a laureate of the Asian Scientist 100 by the Asian Scientist.

== Selected bibliography ==
- G. Ravindra Kumar (2009). "Intense, ultrashort light and dense, hot matter". Pramana - Journal of Physics. 73 (1): 113–155. Bibcode:2009Prama..73..113R. doi:10.1007/s12043-009-0095-7. S2CID 189870104.
- Deepak More, Ch. Rajesh, Amit D. Lad, G. Ravindra Kumar, Shailaja Mahamuni (2010). "Two photon absorption in Mn^{2+}-doped ZnSe quantum dots". Optics Communications. 283 (10): 2150–2154. Bibcode:2010OptCo.283.2150M. doi:10.1016/j.optcom.2010.01.053.
- Gattamraju Ravindra Kumar (2014). "Plasmonics for Ultrahigh Intensity Light". 12th International Conference on Fiber Optics and Photonics. pp. T2C.3. doi:10.1364/PHOTONICS.2014.T2C.3. ISBN 978-1-55752-882-7.
- Ravindra Kumar Gattamraju, Gourab Chatterjee, Prahshant Singh, Amitava Adak, Amit D. Lad, K. M. Schoeffler, L. O. Silva, Sudip Sengupta, P. K. Kaw, Amita Das (2015). "Laboratory simulation of astrophysical magnetic turbulence". APS Division of Plasma Physics Meeting Abstracts. 2015: YO6.013. Bibcode:2015APS..DPPYO6013G.
- Ravindra Kumar Gattamraju, Moniruzzaman Shaikh, Amit Lad, Deep Sarkar, Kamalesh Jana, Indranuj Dey (2016). "Giant magnetic fields and relativistic electron transport in dense, hot plasmas created on solid targets". APS Division of Plasma Physics Meeting Abstracts. 2016: YO5.013. Bibcode:2016APS..DPPYO5013G.

== See also ==
- List of BITS alumni
