= HomeRF =

Wireless networking specification

- Formation: 1998
- Dissolved: 2003
- Type: Industry consortium

HomeRF was a wireless networking specification for home devices. It was developed in 1998 by the Home Radio Frequency Working Group, a consortium of mobile wireless companies that included Proxim Wireless, Intel, Siemens, Motorola, Philips and more than 100 other companies.

The group was disbanded in January 2003, after other wireless networks became accessible to home users and Microsoft began including support for them in its Windows operating systems. As a result, HomeRF fell into obsolescence.

== Description ==
Initially called Shared Wireless Access Protocol (SWAP) and later just HomeRF, this open specification allowed PCs, peripherals, cordless phones and other consumer devices to share and communicate voice and data in and around the home without the complication and expense of running new wires. HomeRF combined several wireless technologies in the 2.4 GHz ISM band, including IEEE 802.11 FH (the frequency-hopping version of wireless data networking) and DECT (the most prevalent digital cordless telephony standard in the world) to meet the unique home networking requirements for security, quality of service (QoS) and interference immunity—issues that still plagued Wi-Fi (802.11b and g).

HomeRF used frequency hopping spread spectrum (FHSS) in the 2.4 GHz frequency band and in theory could achieve a maximum of 10 Mbit/s throughput; its nodes could travel within a 50-meter range of a wireless access point while remaining connected to the personal area network (PAN). Several standards and working groups focused on wireless networking technology in radio frequency (RF). Other standards include the popular IEEE 802.11 family, IEEE 802.16, and Bluetooth.

Proxim Wireless was the only supplier of HomeRF chipsets, and since Proxim also made end products, other manufacturers complained that they had to buy components from their competitor. The fact that HomeRF was developed by a consortium and not an official standards body also put it at a disadvantage against Wi-Fi and its IEEE 802.11 standard.

AT&T joined the group because HomeRF was designed for high-speed broadband services and the need to support PCs, phones, stereos and televisions; but last-mile deployment occurred more slowly than expected and with slower speeds. So it was natural that the home networking market focused more on multi-PC households sharing Internet connections for email and browsing than on integrating phone and entertainment services into a broadband service bundle. As a result, the original promoter companies gradually started pulling out of the group rather than supporting multiple standards. They included IBM, Hewlett-Packard, Compaq, Microsoft, and lastly Intel. That left only companies like Motorola, National Semiconductor, Proxim, and Siemens. Even Proxim started pulling away when negative media surrounding HomeRF started affecting its core data networking business, and that left Siemens to do the work of integrating voice, data and video. Siemens was willing to do it alone with HomeRF technology but was concerned by growing uncertainties in the cordless phone market, including mobile phone as home phone, VoIP over Wi-Fi, and 5 GHz vs. 2.4 GHz. When Siemens eventually got out of the cordless phone market, it was the final nail in the HomeRF coffin.

HomeRF received some success because of its low cost and ease of installation. By September 2000, some confusion came from the "home" in the name, leading some to associate HomeRF with home networks, using other technologies such as IEEE 802.11b for businesses. A digital media receiver for audio was marketed under the name "Motorola SimpleFi" that used HomeRF. In March 2001, Intel announced they would not support further development of HomeRF technology for its Anypoint line. The group promoting 802.11 technology, the Wireless Ethernet Compatibility Alliance (WECA) changed their name to the Wi-Fi Alliance in 2002, as the Wi-Fi brand became popular.

The fact that WECA members lobbied the FCC for two years, which was effective in delaying the approval of wideband frequency-hopping, helped 802.11b catch up and gain an insurmountable lead in the market, which was then extended with 802.11g. The use of OFDM in 802.11a and .11g solved many of the RF interference problems of .11b. WPA and 802.11x also improved security over WEP encryption, which was especially important in the corporate world.

By January 2003, the Home Radio Frequency Working Group had disbanded. Archives of the HomeRF Working Group are maintained by Palo Wireless and Wayne Caswell.

== See also ==
- HomePlug - powerline home networking
- HomePNA - phoneline home networking
- ITU-T G.hn, a standard that provides a way to create a high-speed (up to 1 Gbit/s) local area network using existing home wiring (power lines, phone lines and coaxial cables).
- Wireless LAN Interoperability Forum
