= Vijay Chandru =

Indian entrepreneur

- Education: Massachusetts Institute of Technology; UCLA; BITS Pilani
- Scientific career
- Workplaces: Strand Life Sciences; Indian Institute of Science; Purdue University
- Thesis: Complexity of the Super-Group Approach to Integer Programming (1982)
- Doctoral advisor: Jeremy Frank Shapiro
- Website: be.iisc.ac.in/vijaychandru.html

Vijay Chandru Reddy is an Indian entrepreneur. He is a co-founder and chairman of Strand Life Sciences.

== Biography ==
Chandru received his bachelor's degree from BITS Pilani in Electrical Engineering, a Master of Science from UCLA in Engineering Systems and a PhD from the MIT Operations Research Center in 1982. He started his academic career in teaching and research in 1982. He served professor as Purdue University for 1982-1992. Later in 1992 he joined at the Indian Institute of Science. From 2003 to 2013 he served as Research Affiliate of the Lab for Information and Decision Systems at MIT.

He has co-authored the book Optimization Methods for Logical Inference, published by Wiley Interscience in 1999. He is also a founder of the Association of Biotech led Enterprises (ABLE) and continues to serve as an executive council member. He is one of the inventors of the Simputer.

== Awards ==
Professor Chandru was elected as a fellow of the Indian Academy of Sciences in 1996 and of the Indian National Academy of Engineers in 2010. Chandru has received the Dewang Mehta Award for innovation in information technology for the development of the Simputer in 2001. In 2006, Chandru received the President's Medal of INFORMS (Institute for Operations Research and Management Sciences). Reddy was named a Technology Pioneer of the World Economic Forum in 2006 for his work with Strand Life Sciences and biotechnology. He received the Biospectrum Biotech Entrepreneur of 2007.

== See also ==
- Bharat Desai
- Gunjan Bagla
- List of Indian entrepreneurs
