= Proxim Wireless =

- Traded as: Expert Market: PRXM
- Industry: Wireless networks
- Predecessor: (See text)
- Headquarters: San Jose, California, USA
- Parent: Terabeam
- Website: www.proxim.com

Proxim Wireless Corporation is a San Jose, California-based company that builds scalable broadband wireless networking systems for communities, enterprises, governments, and service providers. It offers wireless LAN, point-to-multipoint and point-to-point products through a channel network. The company is a product of many mergers and acquisitions over the years.

== History ==
Proxim Corporation was founded in 1984, initially headquartered in Mountain View, California. Starting in 1989, it began to develop radio frequency modules using spread spectrum technology. Its first commercial product in 1990 used 900 MHz frequency bands. End-user products called RangeLAN were introduced in 1991 and 1992, reflecting their use as network interface controllers for local area networks (LANs). The first adapter using the Industry Standard Architecture bus and supported Novell NetWare. An initial public offering (IPO) on December 15, 1993 listed the company shares on NASDAQ under symbol PROX. In 1994 the RangLAN2 products starting using 2.4 GHz bands, and in 1995 the RangeLINK product line was introduced. Proxim was a founding member of the Wireless LAN Interoperability Forum in May 1996 to help interoperability between its RangeLAN2 and other wireless technologies. A secondary offering expected to raise an estimated $95 million in June 1996 was delayed and reduced to about $41 million by late July 1996. A product line called Symphony was introduced in 1998.

Proxim was also a core member of the HomeRF Working Group, formed in 1997. The group disbanded at the end of 2002. In January 2000, Proxim announced it had acquired privately held Micrilor of Wakefield, Massachusetts a year earlier. In January 2001 Proxim (then headquartered in Sunnyvale, California) announced it would acquire Netopia Incorporated (listed as symbol NTPA) for approximately $223 million in stock. However, that merger fell apart after Intel announced it would stop developing HomeRF technology in March 2001.

=== Western Multiplex ===
Logo of Western Multiplex

Western Multiplex Corporation had acquired Ubiquity Communication on March 24, 2000, near the end of the dot-com bubble. Western Multiplex, founded in 1979 in Sunnyvale and acquired in 1995 by Glenayre Technologies, had its IPO on July 31, 2000, as it was listed on NASDAQ under symbol WMUX, raising about $90 million. In addition to the Ubiquity product line, Western had lines called Tsunami and Lynx product lines. In March 2001, Western Multiplex acquired privately held WirelessHome Corporation which had been based in Long Beach, California since 1998. In February 2002, Proxim proposed to acquire Western Multiplex and continue to use the stock symbol PROX. The transaction was estimated at a value over $200 million. At the time, Jonathan N. Zakin led Western Multiplex and Davic C. King led Proxim. The merger was approved on March 26, 2002.

Later in 2002, Proxim acquired the Orinoco brand of wireless products of Agere Systems group after it spun off from Lucent.

After it was warned it could be de-listed from the NASDAQ stock market, the company filed for Chapter 11 bankruptcy in June 2005 as Moseley Associates announced it would purchase Proxim's assets for $21 million. However, a few weeks later, Terabeam Incorporated announced that it had bid $28 million for the assets without any proceeds to the previous stock-holders.

=== Telaxis to Terabeam ===
Millitech Corporation, founded in 1982, originally developed millimeter-wave technology, but shifted to August 1999 to focus on point-to-multipoint wireless access products for businesses, with Newbridge Networks its largest customer. Based in South Deerfield, Massachusetts and led by John L. Youngblood, Millitech planned its IPO in September 1999. Milltech changed its name to Telaxis Communications, and the offering was held in February 2000 using the NASDAQ symbol TLXS, raising about $63 million. Telaxis, then with the product line FiberLeap, acquired P-Com XT Corporation of Campbell, California in September 2002.

Privately held Young Design, Incorporated, had acquired Zeus Wireless, and then merged with public Telaxis in April 2003 with the name changed to YDI Wireless in June 2003. Located in Falls Church, Virginia, YDI acquired Phazar Corporation (holding company for Antenna Products Corporation and others and based in Fort Worth, Texas) which had traded under the symbol ANTP, announced in October 2003 and finalized in December.

YDI acquired software maker KarlNet on May 13, 2004, merged with Terabeam Corporation (founded in 2000) effective June 22, 2004, and used the name Terabeam for the new entity. By June 25, 2004, the Company acquired the service provider Ricochet Networks.

On September 4, 2007, Terabeam (then headquartered in San Jose, California and led by Robert Fitzgerald) announced it would change its name to Proxim Wireless Corporation, and change its NASDAQ stock symbol from TRBM to PRXM. The shares were removed from NASDAQ in April 2009, and moved to the OTCQX of OTC Markets Group. On August 13, 2009, Proxim received an investment of $7.5 million, with $5 million coming from an arm of SRA Holdings, Inc. of Japan. Pankaj Manglik was reported to be chief executive in 2010. On May 13, 2010, common stock shares were combined in a one-for-one-hundred reverse split. In December 2010, the shares were withdrawn from the OTCQX to be traded on the so-called "Pink Sheets".
