= Amkette EvoTV =

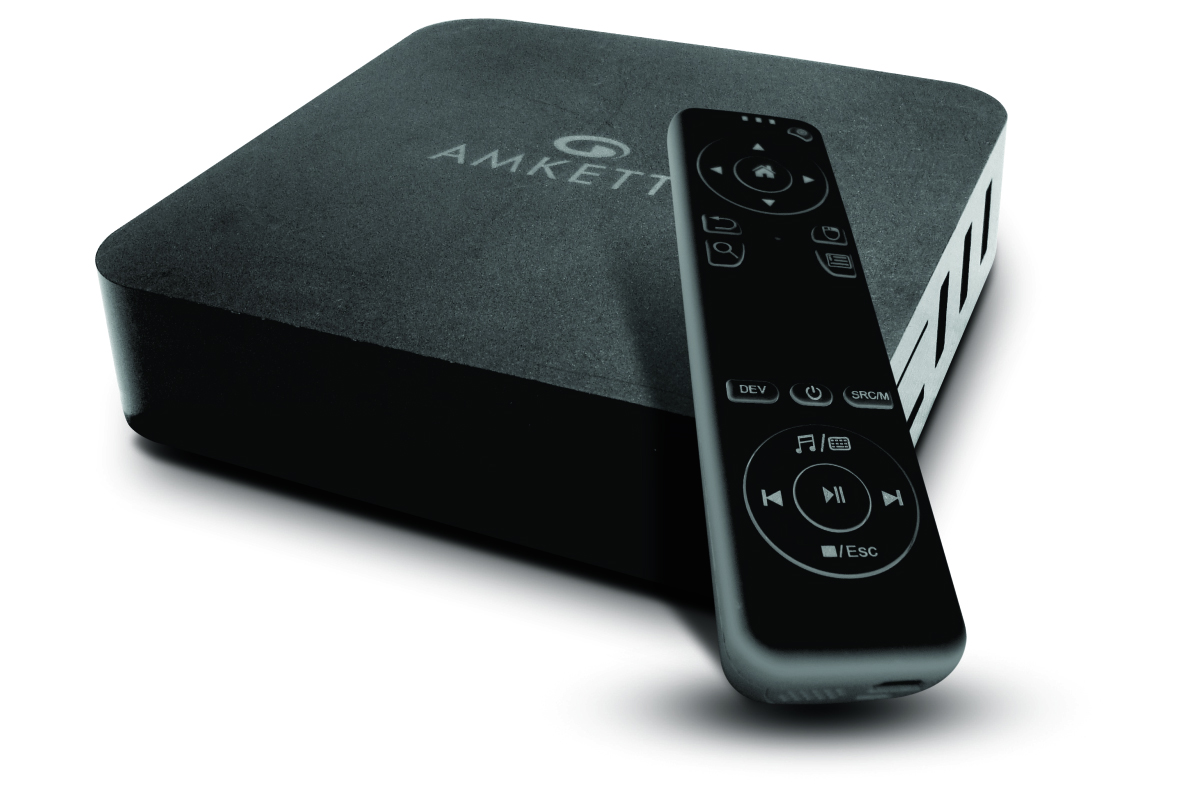
- EvoTV XL
- Manufacturer: Amkette
- Operating system: Android v4.0.4 Ice Cream Sandwich
- CPU: ARM Cortex-A9, ARM Mali-400
- Memory: 1 GB (RAM)
- Storage: 4 GB (ROM)
- Connectivity: Internal Wi-Fi - 802.11 b/g/n, Ethernet 10/100Base-T, uPnP (DLNA), Samba Share (Windows)
- Predecessor: EvoTV (non-XL)
- Website: evotv.amkette.com

EvoTV is a range of digital media players developed by Amkette that brings internet and Web 2.0 features to the television. EvoTV was envisioned to be a substitute to the growing range of Smart TVs in the market. Instead of replacing complete television sets to get Internet-based features users could just connect an EvoTV and get the same features at a much lower cost. EvoTV is based on the Android operating system, can connect to the internet wirelessly, and can stream local, network and internet media and audio files. Once connected users can access Android Playstore Apps using EvoTV on their television. The first EvoTV was launched in the middle of 2012 and received many positive reviews and awards. In 2013 Amkette EvoTV won the NDTV Gadget Award for the Best Consumer Electronic. In 2014 two news versions of EvoTV were introduced bringing the total variants to five.

As of 2022 the Web site evotv.amkette.com was dead, and the search term "EvoTV" found no matches on the Amkette Web site.

== 2014 models ==
With the continuing demand for EvoTV, two new models were introduced in May 2014 - EvoTV Media Center and Android Central. These were focused towards online and offline media consumption.

== Features ==
EvoView - the user interface which allows customization of the home screen for applications, videos, and weblinks.

EvoRemote - a remote control which has gathered much praise from critics as being a direct method to interact with EvoTV and access all the features available on it. It comes with a touch sensitive button to control the movement of the EvoTV pointer.

MyYTViewer - is an application that allows creation of live groups based on various criteria such as channels, category, terms and more for video from YouTube.

Motion Gaming - allows users to play games with the motion of the remote control.

== EvoTV XL ==
In December 2012 EvoTV XL, a next generation EvoTV device was launched and received many positive reviews and awards. It supports better hardware specifications and Android 4.0.1 (ICS). Boxtv.com, an online media streaming service has made a custom application for EvoTV. EvoTV XL is also XBMC enabled.

== Reviews ==
Date	Author	Publisher	Comments
2012 - June 13	IBN Live	IBNLive	Similar to Apple TV, EvoTV is a digital media device which allows users to access content like videos, games and websites using WiFi and broadband connection. It comes with a remote that acts like a mouse and has a mic to facilitate conversations on VoIP (like Skype).
2012 - July 19	Jayesh Limaye	Techtree	review that "The Amkette EvoTV is a unique device that converts your boring television into a really Smart TV. While its UI displays some lag, it performs well in media playback as well as light gaming. Its Internet features, such as web browsing, social networking, streaming media, IM chat, and torrent client place it way ahead of rival media players currently available in the market. Its motion-sensing remote control is another fun addition. Overall, this would have made for a very good buy, had the asking rate been lower. "
2012 - August	Nandagopal Rajan	Business Today	review that "Media boxes generally try to cash in on the proliferation of downloaded digital media, with some trying their hand at smart features and Internet connectivity. But none of them are really as smart as the Amkette EvoTV, which gives an Android driven intelligence boost to your TV. With the EvoTV plugged in, your old TV will be able to surf the Net, check mail, play millions of videos, play motion and other games and access files from the home network and so on."
2012 - August	Aaron Almeida	Tech 2.0	review that "This device is a great solution for those who have flat panel television without smartTV capabilities. Having Android Gingerbread on board is another great advantage for your television."
2013	Mahananda Bohidar	Hindu Business Line	"The Evo TV is an interesting concept for the Indian home. For a big chunk of the population which might not see the need or potential of a big-brand smart TV yet, the Evo TV presents itself to be an affordable option, seemingly worth a try."
February 6, 2013	Vishal Mathur	Thinkdigit	The updated Amkette Evo TV is a polished product. Its unique element- motion control - works smoothly and with a much more assured response. The updated OS and more RAM have made considerable difference in terms of how quick this device responds.
April 2, 2013	Sahil Bones Gupta	BGR	If you have been bitten by the Smart TV bug, then it's not the TV you are looking for, you are looking for the Amkette EVO TV XL.
June 4, 2013	Tushar Kanwar	Businessworld	Amkette EvoTV XL scores a 8 on 10. It is Capable of media playback, a good compromise between memory expandability and built-in storage, surprisingly good mobile gaming capabilities with the motion sensitive remote, excellent connectivity options.

== EvoTV variants ==
Categories	Amkette EvoTV 2 (2016)	Amkette EvoTV XL (2012)	Amkette EvoTV XT (2013)	Amkette EvoTV (2012)
Storage	8GB	4GB	4 GB	4 GB
Processor	ARM Cortex-A5 1.6 GHz + ARM Mali-450	ARM Cortex-A9 + ARM Mali-401/ XBMC enabled	ARM Cortex-A9 + ARM MALI-400	ARM Cortex-A9 + ARM Mali-400
RAM	DDR3 SDRAM 1GB	DDR3 SDRAM 1 GB	DDR3 SDRAM 1 GB	DDR3 SDRAM 512 MB
Network	WiFi - Built-in 802.11b/g/n, Bluetooth 4.0, Ethernet	Wireless, Ethernet	Wireless, Ethernet	Wireless, Ethernet
Audio Output	7.1	7.1	7.1	7.1
Operating system	Optimized Android 4.4 (Kitkat)	Android 4.0.4 ICS	Android 4.0.4 ICS	Android 2.3.4 Gingerbread
Remote	2.4 GHz Wireless Air Mouse, Dual Mode	2.4 GHz Wireless, Air Mouse, Accelerometer, Universal Remote, Wireless Mic, Touch sensor	2.4 GHz Wireless, Air Mouse, Touch sensor, Universal Remote	2.4 GHz, Touch sensor, Universal Remote, Wireless Mic, Accelerometer
Gaming	with EvoGame Pad Pro	Motion Sensor	Touch Sensor	Motion Sensor
Dolby Digital/DTS	-	Yes	Yes	Yes

== Similar devices ==
EvoTV has most commonly been compared to Smart TVs, Amazon Fire TV, Apple TV, and Roku.

== Negative feedback ==
Some tech jourlists deemed the first generation EvoTV to have a sluggish user interface which reduced the overall experience. Others have criticized the use of Android Gingerbread as being outdated. These issues have been corrected in the second generation EvoTV XL

== See also ==
- Digital media player
- Comparison of set-top boxes
