= Swami Manohar =

Indian businessman and researcher

Swami Manohar, otherwise known as Manohar Swaminathan, is a co-founder and the CEO of PicoPeta Simputers Pvt. Ltd. He completed his undergraduate program in electronics and communication engineering in Government College of Technology, Coimbatore during which he was a part of a campus team that designed an electronic voting machine in the year 1981, which was actually the first designed in India. After obtaining his PhD in computer science from Brown University he was a faculty at the University of North Carolina for two years and then was at the Indian Institute of Science (IISc), Bangalore, between 1990 and 2005. He was on the faculty of the department of Computer Science and Automation (CSA) and the Supercomputer Education and Research Center (SERC) at the institute. He has been a visiting faculty at Columbia University, University of Missouri and the University of Texas. While at IISc, he co-invented the Simputer, was awarded the Dewang Mehta Award for Innovation in IT, and pioneered the faculty entrepreneurship activity at IISc, which has since catalyzed similar activity in IITs and other educational institutes in India. He co-founded Strand Life Sciences (formerly Strand Genomics), and String Labs, the first academic incubating company in India.

Manohar has contributed to research in computer graphics, visualisation, virtual reality and CAD for rapid prototyping. He has been the thesis advisor for over forty graduate students, including three PhDs. As CEO of PicoPeta he was instrumental in converting the prototype of the Simputer into a real commercial product, the Amida Simputer, India's first commercial handheld product. His broad interest is in the area of societal impact of information and communication technologies.

In 2005, PicoPeta was acquired by Geodesic Information Systems, and Swami Manohar assumed the additional role of chief IP and strategy officer of Geodesic.

Elina Networks has elected Manohar to its board of directors. He is a founder and managing director at Limberlink Technologies Pvt. Ltd.

The Jed-i Gifted Engineering program is started by Manohar and Dr V Vinay, who are former professors of computer science at the Indian Institute of Science. It is their way of sharing engineering, design, and innovation with young engineers, whom they hope will go on to build the next generation of global companies out of India.

Swami Manohar is currently at Microsoft Research as senior principal researcher in the Technologies for Emerging markets group. Currently working on technologies for accessibility (improving the productivity of blind programmers) and IoT for emerging markets.

== Academic interests ==
- Parallel and VLSI architectures and algorithms for graphics and visualization
- Interactive sculpting
- Voxel-based CAD tools for layered manufacturing
- Virtual Reality Modeling Language
- Internet Technologies
