= Indian Laser Association =

ILA
- Founded: 26 December 1987
- Type: Multidisciplinary Professional Organization
- Purpose: Laser technology and applications
- Method: Seminars, Symposia and training courses; publications of books and journals
- Members: 1000+ (Life-members)
- Key people: President, Gen Secretary
- Website: www.ila.org.in

The Indian Laser Association (ILA) is an association of persons interested in laser technology and applications. The ILA is non-profit multidisciplinary professional organization. The association aims to promote education, advancement and applications of laser science and technology in India, through various activities such as organization of seminars, symposia and training courses; publications of books and journals; and promotion of active interaction with other professional institutions especially in the field of medicine and engineering.

== Objectives ==
1. Help towards the advancement, dissemination and application of laser science and techniques.
2. Promote interaction among all persons, bodies, institutions (private and/or state owned, national or international) and specifically interested in lasers and related areas.
3. Organize seminars, symposia, workshops, lectures, debates, training courses, conferences, and film shows pertaining to lasers and their applications.
4. Organize regional and/or special interest chapters in the country as and when needed.
5. Acquire property such as office premises, guest houses, repair cum training workshops and research and development centers.
6. Secure grants, funds, endowments and to administer them to further any or all of the above aims and objectives.
7. Frame, adopt and modify rules and regulations by which the association may conduct its business.

== Conferences ==
Every year the ILA arranges a National Laser Symposium (NLS) under the aegis of DAE-BRNS. Before every symposium, the ILA arranges tutorials for students and young researchers.

NLS-24 Conference: Organised at RRCAT, Indore 2–5 December 2015.

NLS-23 Conference: Organised at S.V. University, Tirupati 3–6 December 2014.

NLS-22 Conference: Organised at Manipal University, Manipal 8–11 January 2014.

NLS-21 Conference: Organised at BARC, Mumbai 6–9 February 2013.

NLS-20 Conference: Organised at Anna University, Chennai 9–12 January 2012.

NLS-19 Conference: Organised at RRCAT, Indore 1–4 December 2010.

2009 Conference: Organised at BARC, Mumbai 13–16 January 2010.

2008 Conference: Organised at LASTEC, DRDO, Delhi 7–10 January 2009.

2007 Conference: Organised at M.S. University of Baroda, Vadodara, Gujarat 17–20 December 2007.

2006 Conference: Organised at RRCAT, Indore 5–8 December 2006.

2005 Conference: Organised at VIT, Vellore 7–10 December 2005.

2004 Conference: Organised at BARC, Mumbai 10–13 January 2005.

== Publications ==
Proceedings of the NLS are published and distributed after each conference to participants.

- NLS-25: Proceedings of National Laser Symposium (NLS-25) ISBN 978-81-903321-7-0
- NLS-24: Proceedings of National Laser Symposium (NLS-24) ISBN 978-81-903321-6-3
- NLS-23: Proceedings of National Laser Symposium (NLS-23) ISBN 978-81-903321-5-6
- NLS-22: Proceedings of National Laser Symposium (NLS-22) ISBN 978-81-903321-4-9
- NLS-21: Proceedings of National Laser Symposium (NLS-21) ISBN 978-81-903321-3-2
- NLS-6: Proceedings of National Laser Symposium (NLS-6) ISBN 81-903321-1-2
- NLS-5: Proceedings of National Laser Symposium (NLS-5) ISBN 81-903321-0-4
- NLS-4: Proceedings of National Laser Symposium (NLS-4) ISBN 81-7764-734-2
- NLS-3: Proceedings of National Laser Symposium (NLS-3)
- 2001: Proceedings of National Laser Symposium 2001 ISBN 81-7764-229-4

External links

- NLS-25: Year 2016 Conference, at KIIT University, Bhubaneswar
- NLS-24: Year 2015 Conference, at RRCAT, Indore
- NLS-23: Year 2014 Conference at SV Univ, Tirupati
- NLS-22: Year 2014 Conference at Manipal Univ, Manipal
- NLS-21: Year 2013 Conference at BARC, Mumbai
- NLS-09: Year 2009 Conference
- NLS-08: Year 2008 Conference
- NLS-07: Year 2007 Conference
- NLS-06: Year 2006 Conference
- NLS-05: Year 2005 Conference
- NLS-04 Year 2005 Conference
- Official website of The Indian Laser Association
- Raja Ramanna Center for Advanced Technology, Indore
