= Jan TV =

Indian television channel

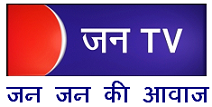
- Logo for Jan TV
- Country: India
- Headquarters: Jaipur, Rajasthan, India

Programming
- Picture format: 4:3, SDTV, mpeg4

Ownership
- Owner: CSL Infomedia Pvt. Ltd.

History
- Launched: 13 May 2012

Links
- Website: www.jantv.in

Availability

Terrestrial
- Tata Play: Channel No. 1185
- Airtel digital TV: Channel No. 355
- Jio Fiber: Channel No. 1185

Streaming media
- Website Live Stream: www.jantv.in/live.php
- YouTube Live Stream: www.youtube.com/jantvindia/live

Jan TV is a satellite television channel from India owned by CSL Infomedia Pvt. Ltd. It was inaugurated by the Chief Minister of Rajasthan, Mr.Ashok Gehlot on 13 May 2012 in Jaipur.

== Management ==
Jan TV Editor-In-Chief is Mr. Surendra Kumar Surana, who is also the Director of CSL Infomedia Private Limited

== Programs ==
Jan TV telecasts Hindi news, education, employment, agriculture and entertainment programs. Jan TV is available live all over the world through live streaming on its portal.

Some of the popular programs on Jan TV are:

- Computer Shaala
- Satellite Education
- News and Current Affairs
- Dharti Ugle Sona
- Gulistaan
- Crime Report
- Bollywood Express
- Yadoo Ka Safar
- Medi Talk
- Jan Surbhi
- Ek Mulakaat
- 33 Zila 33 Khabar
- Raag Sarita
- Roshani Ka Safar
- World This Week

== See also ==
- List of Hindi-language television channels
