= S. K. Roongta =

S.K. Roongta
- Citizenship: India
- Education: BITS, Pilani; IIFT
- Occupations: Chairman of SAIL; President of Institute for Steel Development & Growth.

Sushil Kumar Roongta is the former chairman of Steel Authority of India Limited (SAIL), serving from August 2006 to May 2010. He is an alumnus of BITS Pilani and Indian Institute of Foreign Trade (IIFT).

He was also the first chairman of International Coal Ventures Limited (ICVL) – a JV of five leading Public Sector Undertakings (PSUs): viz. SAIL, Coal India Limited (CIL), Rashtriya Ispat Nigam Limited (RINL), NMDC, and NTPC.

He has been part of various think tanks and is widely regarded as one of the principal experts in the field of metal, power and public sector turnarounds. He was Chairman of ‘Panel of Experts on Reforms in Central Public Sector Enterprises’ constituted by Planning Commission, widely known as ‘Roongta Committee’. Its report is used as a benchmark for public sector reforms today. Roongta has been and continues to be director on multiple corporate boards. He is also associated with educational institutions and non-profit organization. He was chairman of the board of governors of IIT-Bhubaneswar.

== Career ==
Roongta started his career in 1972 as a marketing executive for SAIL. After serving in various marketing position, he was promoted to the SAIL Board as a Commercial Director in 2004. He later served as the head of Human Resources and Personnel Director of the Corporate Planning and Raw Materials Division.

Under Roongta’s leadership, SAIL achieved good financial performance. SAIL is operating at 115% of its rated capacity, and has improved it’s productivity & cost competitiveness. It has posted a profit (before tax) to the tune of over Rs. 9400 crores in FY’09.

With initiatives taken by SAIL under the guidance of Mr. Roongta, SAIL’s net profit of Rs. 2813 cr. (US $570 million) during H1’09 was the highest among all steel producers in the world.

== Affiliations and leadership ==
Roongta has held membership and leadership positions in many trade and professional organizations. These include:

- All India Management Association (Council Member)
- Associated Chambers of Commerce and Industry of India (Advisory Council Member)
- Birla Institute of Technology And Science (General Body Member)
- Federation of Indian Chambers of Commerce & Industry (Executive Committee Member; 'Steel Committee' Chairman; Non-Ferrous Metal Committee Mentor)
- Indian Institute of Technology, Bhubaneswar (Board of Governors Chairman)
- Institute for Steel Development & Growth (President)
- Confederation of Indian Industry (National Council Member)
- World Steel Association (Executive Committee Member)

== Awards and recognition ==
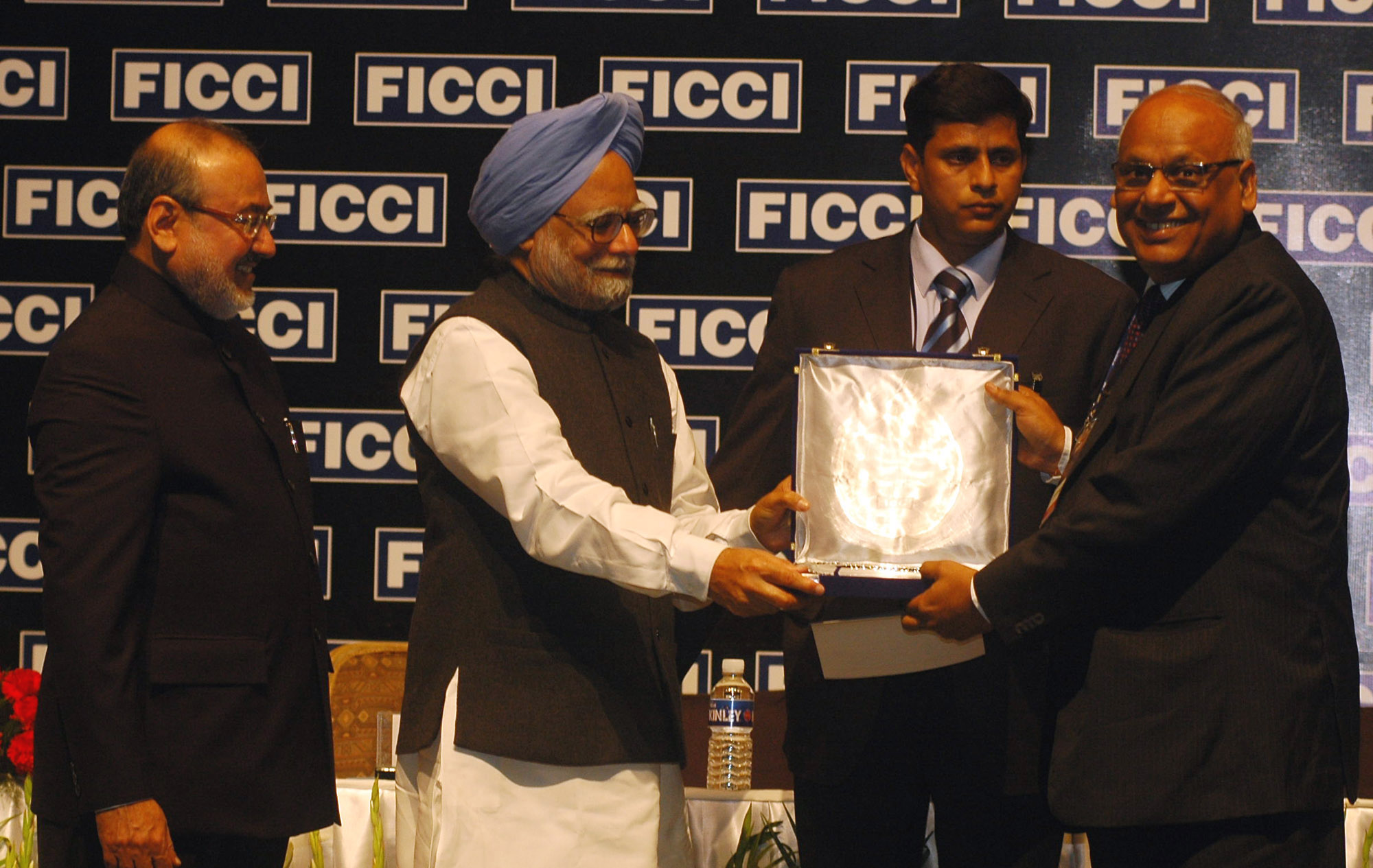
Roongta (right) accepts an outstanding achievement award from the Prime Minister of India (2008).

Roongta is represented in several committees of CII viz., National Committee on Mining, CEOs Council on Manufacturing, National Committee on WTO & Trade Agreement and Apex Council on PSUs. He served as the only Indian CEO on the Executive Committee of the World Steel Association in October 2009.

Roongta is the recipient of a number of awards including SCOPE Award for Excellence & Outstanding Contribution to the Public Sector Management – Individual Category 2007-08. , and the IIM-JRD Tata award for excellence in Corporate Leadership in Metallurgical industries, 2016.
