= Rajiv Bapna =

Indian businessman

Rajiv Kumar Bapna is the founder of Amkette, first-ever domestic manufacturer of floppy diskettes in India. He completed his bachelor's degree in electronics engineering from the prestigious Birla Institute of Technology and Science, Pilani (BITS-Pilani). After his brief stint at the Department of Electronics, he moved to the Middle East where he headed the technology division of Citibank for West Asian markets as the Vice-President of Information Technology.

He returned to India in 1985 and started Amkette in 1986.

Amkette later diversified into other hardware products including game controllers, EvoTV range, audio, wireless and other computer products.
