= AudioTron =

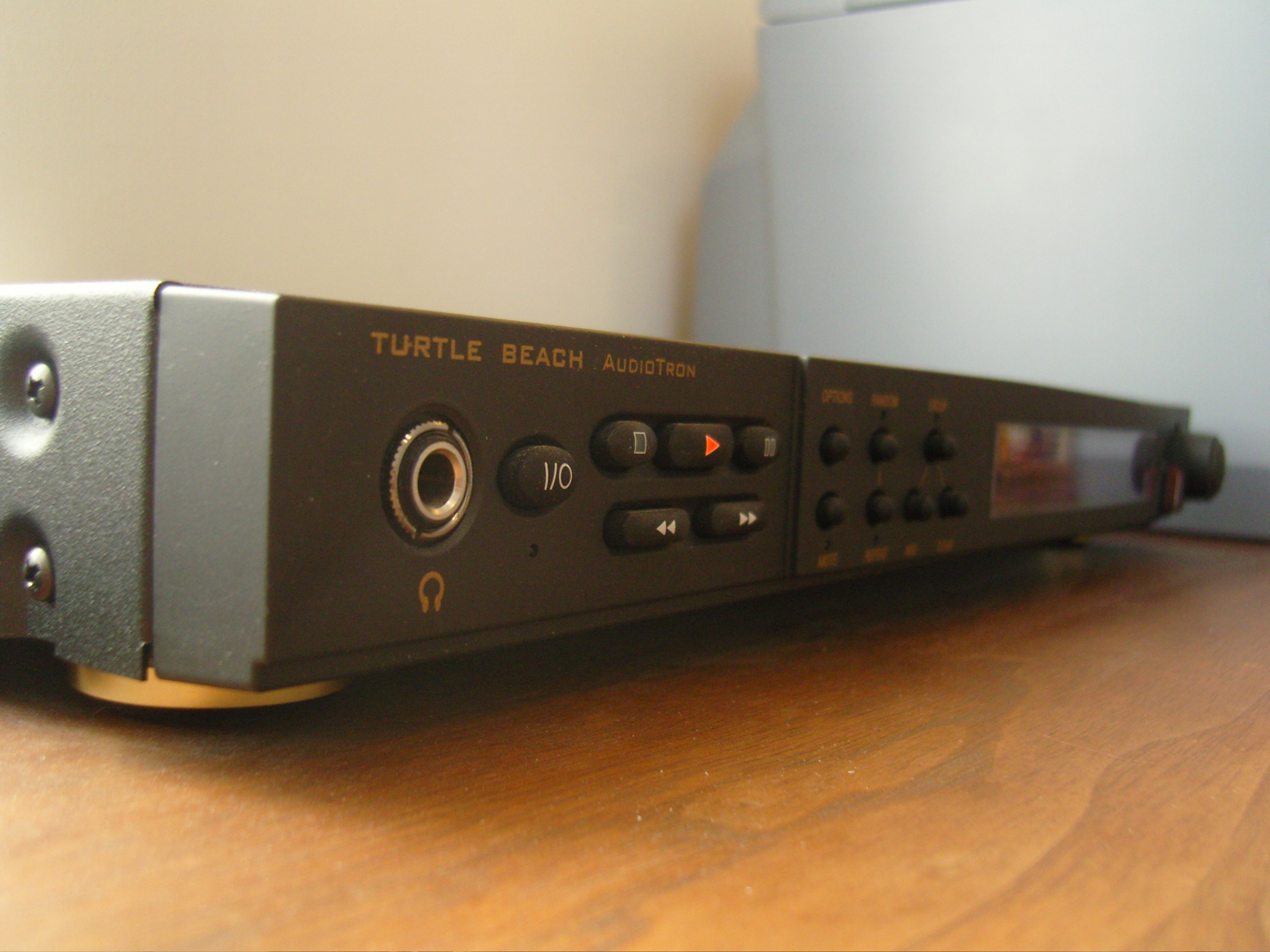
AudioTron

The Turtle Beach AudioTron AT-100 and AT-101 are 1U rack-mountable, hi-fi network music players. An AudioTron can stream digital music files from personal computers or NAS devices without the need to install server software on these storage devices since the AudioTron is based on Windows CE and is therefore a computer that looks like audio hardware. Supported file formats include Wave, WMA, MP3 and MP3 playlists. These files can reside on a Microsoft Windows network share or on a Samba server. AudioTron reads music files over Ethernet or HPNA network, and generates analog audio via RCA connectors as well as digital audio via S/PDIF.

An AudioTron can play streaming media from Internet radio stations. The formats supported are Windows Media, SHOUTcast and Icecast. The Windows Media support is limited to the features available before the release of Windows Media Player 10. Connecting to Internet radio stations was once supported through a free service called TurtleRadio. When TurtleRadio was shut down by Turtle Beach, Turtle Beach disclosed an alternative method available in the device's firmware (using a local file) to load one's Internet radio station list into the AudioTron.

Users operate the AudioTron with a PC/laptop on the same network using the web interface from the built-in webserver, with a remote control, or on the device itself using buttons and a large "Turn & Push Selector Knob" on its front panel. The knob is used to navigate song selection menu on a green two-line LCD. Users can select songs by turning and pushing the knob, based on various combinations of Genre, Album, Title and Artist tags. The knob also serves as volume control and playhead control while a song is being played. Standard Play, Pause, Stop, Forward and Rewind buttons can be used to control playback. An infrared remote control comes with AudioTron and can be used instead of the front panel.

AudioTron obtains an IP address from DHCP server by default. The AudioTron can be configured via buttons on the front panel or remotely from a web browser. AudioTron runs a web server which can be accessed via any standard browser. The web server also allows users to access the complete collection of songs online. Users can play songs or send them to AudioTron's play queue, without using the front panel or remote control. The AudioTron is also able to determine the type of device the web server was being accessed from, and devices such as PDAs will display a simplified remote control screen more suitable to the smaller size of a PDA screen.

First released in 2001, AudioTron was ahead of its time in providing driverless music streaming, S/PDIF and Internet radio support. The AudioTron operated as a standalone music player by making use of the Microsoft SMB file server protocol; that is, it could load music from any SMB file server, although the Audiotron uses NTLMv1 for authentication and so the Audiotron does not work well in modern SMB environments. As a workaround when using Samba on a unix-like system, it is possible to configure Samba to allow NTLMv1 authentication (not recommended), or to make the Samba share containing music files accessible to guest (unauthenticated) users. For example, when playing music from a Vortexbox server, the unit will be able to access the read-only Music share.

Production of this device stopped in 2004.

Turtle Beach continued to support TurtleRadio until March 2007. After that time, the TurtleRadio website was retired and users had to change the configuration of their AudioTron to use a local file to set the list of radio stations that their AudioTron could stream. In March 2010, Turtle Beach implemented a redirect that allows the AudioTron to be used with the Webstation Radio Database. Similar to the TurtleRadio website, users can create accounts and select their own favorites from thousands of radio stations which will then be available on the AudioTron. Otherwise change the default TURTLERADIO PLAYER ID to read as 'Audiotron' which will give 1000 radio stations under 56 categories.
