= Wireless LAN Interoperability Forum =

Former industry organization

The Wireless LAN Interoperability Forum (WLIF) was a non-profit industry organization founded in 1996 to promote and certify wireless LAN products. It was active from about 1996 through 1998 and disbanded in 2001.

== History ==
The organization was announced on May 20, 1996, chaired by Chris Gladwin of Zenith Data Systems. It first based its technology on the RangeLAN2 products licensed by Proxim Wireless, which were originally developed around 1994. The RangeLAN2 name was later changed to OpenAir, and IEEE 802.11 standards were later mentioned, although the Wi-Fi Alliance controlled the trademark for those protocols. In 1998 Mike Jones of Intermec Technologies was its chairman and its membership included: AMP (now part of Tyco Electronics), Citadel, Cruise Technologies, Data General, Fujitsu Personal Systems, Hand Held Products, Hewlett-Packard, IBM, IDWare, Intermec Technologies, Kansai, Kinetic Computer, LXE, MaxTech, Mitsubishi Electronics America, Monarch Marketing Systems (subsidiary of Paxar, then part of Avery Dennison), Motorola, NEC Computer Systems Division, Percon (formerly a division of PSC Inc., later IntelliTrack), Proxim Wireless and Sharp Corporation. Hand Held Products (later Honeywell) marketed Dolphin RF devices to extend Ethernet and a barcode scanner.

== RangeLAN2 ==
RangeLAN2 was a broad family of wireless devices developed by Proxim Wireless, and is a trademark of that company. It also refers to the RangeLAN2, used by these devices, which was subsequently officially renamed OpenAir. RangeLAN2 devices have typical bandwidths of about 2 Mbit/s, and an indoor range of about 150 ft (46 m), similar to 802.11b. RangeLAN2 uses spread-spectrum radio transmission technology. These devices can interoperate with 802.11b and can still be used today. Support for RangeLAN2 products was aimed primarily at the Microsoft Windows market, but drivers for some RangeLAN2 products (such as PCMCIA cards) for Mac OS 9 were developed, although these did not get wide distribution. Linux drivers were also developed for many RangeLAN2 devices.

Typical RangeLAN2 figures:

- Radio Data Rate: 1.6 Mbit/s per channel, 800 kbit/s fallback rate
- Channels: Supports 15 independent, non-interfering "virtual channels"
- Official Indoor Range: Up to 500 feet (~150 m) radius (not necessarily reached in practice)
- Official Outdoor range: 1,000+ feet (300+ m) radius

== OpenAir ==
The protocol operated in the 2.4 GHz ISM band and used frequency hopping with 0.8 and 1.6 Mbit/s bit rates via 2 or 4 bits per symbol frequency-shift keying modulation.

This protocol was in use prior to the adoption of the IEEE 802.11b standard, and was in competition with it, and uses approximately the same portion of the radio spectrum. When 802.11b was adopted as a standard, the RangeLAN2 market began to contract and OpenAir use declined.

== See also ==
- IEEE 802.11
