= Vinod Agarwal =

Indian-American businessman

Vinod K. Agarwal was an Indian-American businessman and scientist. He was a professor at McGill University in Montreal, Quebec, Canada from 1978 to 1992. He then founded LogicVision, which he took public in October 2001, as the first technology IPO following the terrorist attacks earlier that year. Agarwal left LogicVision in 2005 to start SemIndia, a semiconductor company based in India.

== Biography ==
Born to Madhuri Sharan Agrawal and Premvati Agrawal in Mathura, India, he received his undergraduate education at Birla Institute of Technology and Science, followed by an M.S. in electrical engineering from the University of Pittsburgh and a Ph.D. in electrical engineering from Johns Hopkins University.

== Professorship ==
After his Ph.D., he joined the faculty of the computer science department at the McGill University in Montreal. He stayed on the faculty for 16 years, eventually retiring as head of the Department of Electrical Engineering.

== Accolades ==
Agarwal was recognized for his contributions to the field by being named Silicon India's 2002 Entrepreneur of the year, as well as being profiled in Fortune magazine and the Wharton Global Business Forum among other publications and conferences.
