= Surendra Kumar Surana =

Indian managing director and CEO

- Education: B.Tech. in Electrical Engineering
- Alma mater: BITS Pilani
- Occupations: Managing Director and CEO
- Employer: Compucom Software Limited
- Website: compucom.co.in jantv.in

Surendra Kumar Surana is the Managing Director and CEO of Compucom Software Limited, Jaipur which is listed in the National Stock Exchange of India and Bombay Stock Exchange, and the Editor-In-Chief of the satellite television network, Jan TV.

== Personal background ==
Surana attended the Netarhat Awasiya Vidyalaya in Bihar and earned his Bachelor of Technology undergraduate degree in Electrical Engineering from BITS Pilani.

== Professional background ==
Following graduation from BITS Pilani, Surana has worked in software development(also later through Compucom) and consulting with Bell Atlantic.
