= LogicVision =

American electronic design automation company

LogicVision, Inc.
- Formerly: LV Software (1992)
- Company type: Public (2001–2009)
- Industry: Electronic design automation
- Founded: 1992; 34 years ago in San Jose, California
- Founder: Vinod Agarwal
- Defunct: 2009
- Fate: Acquired by Mentor Graphics, 2009
- Headquarters: San Jose, California, United States
- Products: ETCreate, ETAccess, SiVision
- Parent: Mentor Graphics (2009)

LogicVision, Inc. was an electronic design automation (EDA) company, offering chip, board and system-level design for testing (DFT) solutions and support to ASIC vendors based in San Jose, California, United States. Founded in 1992, it was acquired by Mentor Graphics in 2009. Their embedded test, BIST and yield learning tools were applicable to digital, analog and mixed-signal designs. LogicVision had no profitable year during its existence as a publicly traded company.

== History ==
The company was founded as LV Software in 1992 by Vinod Agarwal, a former McGill University professor in electrical engineering. Later that year, LV Software was renamed as LogicVision. The company became publicly traded in October 2001 on the NASDAQ as LGVN, and in November 2004 they acquired SiVerion. Founder Vinod Agarwal resigned as chairman of the board in November 2005. On August 18, 2009, Oregon based Mentor Graphics acquired LogicVision in an all-stock arrangement valued at $13 million. Mentor incorporated LogicVision as part of an existing business unit.

== LogicVision tool suites ==
- ETCreate — Embedded test IP insertion tool for logic, memory and mixed-signal testing
- ETAccess — Interactive program that works with 3rd party testers for controlling and logging of data on the device for at-speed testing
- SiVision — Yield analysis program which looks at foundry and performance data to diagnose possible problems

== Management team ==
- James T. Healy, President and CEO
- Bruce M. Jaffe, Vice President of Finance and Chief Financial Officer
- Ron H. Mabry, Vice President of Field Operations and Applications Engineering
- Farhad Hayat, Vice President of Marketing
- Benoit Nadeau-Dostie, Ph.D., Chief Scientist
