= Strand Life Sciences =

Indian technology company

Strand Life Sciences Pvt. Ltd.
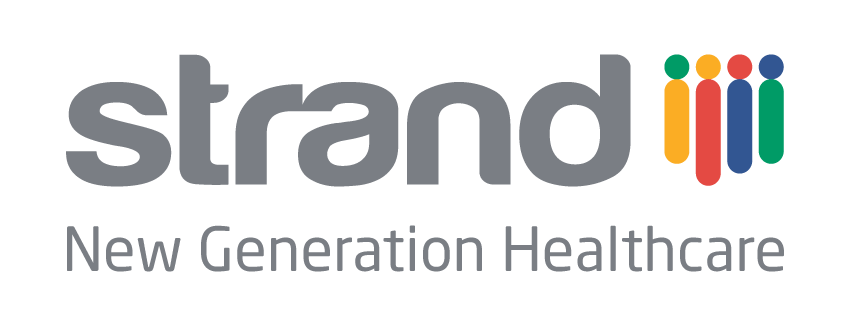
- Company type: Private
- Industry: Software; Life Sciences; Healthcare
- Founded: 2000
- Headquarters: Bangalore, Karnataka, India
- Key people: Ramesh Hariharan (CEO); Anand Janakiraman (President RiX); Rohan Pais (COO); Vamsi Veermachaneni (CSO)
- Products: StrandAdvantage; Strand NGS; Heptox; Avadis
- Parent: Reliance Strategic Business Ventures
- Website: www.strandls.com

Strand Life Sciences (formerly Strand Genomics) is an Indian bioinformatics and computational biology company headquartered in Bangalore. It develops software and analytical tools for life sciences research, including applications in data mining, predictive modelling, and computational chemistry. Strand also offers custom solutions based on its intellectual property. In 2021, Reliance Industries' subsidiary Reliance Strategic Business Ventures acquired a controlling stake in Strand Life Sciences.

== History ==
Strand Life Sciences was founded in October 2000 by Professors Vijay Chandru, Ramesh Hariharan, Swami Manohar, and V. Vinay. It was registered as Strand Genomics, but was later renamed to Strand Life Sciences as it dealt with various other aspects of life sciences. In August 2007, Strand and Agilent Technologies, Inc. entered an agreement in which Strand develops and supports Agilent's GeneSpring software which Agilent obtained through Silicon Genetics acquisition in August 2004. In October 2010, Strand and Agilent renewed the agreement for Strand to expand the scope of Agilent's GeneSpring across multiple life sciences disciplines.

== Software ==
- Strand NGS (formerly Avadis NGS) is a software platform for next-generation sequencing data analysis.
- GeneSpring GX (version 9.0.0 onwards), GeneSpring Workgroup (version 7.0.0 onwards), and Mass Profiler Pro are developed by Strand's R&D division in Bangalore.
- Avadis is a data mining and visualization platform.
- Sarchitect is a platform for modeling and predicting drug-relevant properties of molecules in silico.
- ArrayAssist was developed for Stratagene, Inc., based on the Avadis platform. The production was stopped after Stratagene was acquired by Agilent Technologies, Inc. in 2007.
