= Amkette =

Indian multinational technology company

- Type: Private
- Industry: Technology; Consumer electronics; Computer hardware; Computer software
- Founded: January 1986; 40 years ago
- Founder: Rajiv Bapna
- Headquarters: New Delhi, India
- Area served: Worldwide
- Key people: Rajiv Bapna (CEO)
- Products: Wireless products; Speakers; Peripherals; Game controller
- Number of employees: 1,000 (2012)
- Website: www.amkette.com

Amkette is an Indian multinational technology company that manufacturer of computer hardware and consumer electronics, computer peripherals, and gaming accessories, headquartered in New Delhi, India. The company launched a smart TV product called EvoTV in 2012. The company's manufacturing facility is in China while the software team is based in Bangalore, India.

== History ==
Amkette was started by Rajiv Bapna in 1984. It became one of the largest manufacturers and exporters of floppy diskettes from India, selling to Russia and other countries in Europe. The plant manufactured 8", 5.25" and 3.5" diskettes. At its peak it had a production capacity of 30 million floppies daily. The plant was shut down in Jan 2013 and completely converted into a R&D center.

In November 2014, the company launched a headphone with a sharing jack, Trubeats Tango, that allows listeners to connect additional listening devices to the headphone.

In December 2016, the company launched the successor of its flagship product Evo TV 2 4k capable of playing 4k content. In the subsequent year, the company launched the next generation of Evo TV, the Evo TV 3 4K with an upgraded 2GB of RAM.

After a decade of the launch of Amkette TV Box which converted normal TVs into smart TVs, In 2021, the company introduced its flagship product, EvoFox Game box in the Indian market.

=== Timeline ===
Date	Milestone
1986	First 8" floppy diskette shipped out
1987	Established 5.25" floppy diskette plant
1991	Established 3.5" floppy diskette plant
2003	Introduction of wireless keyboard and mouse
2004	Introduction of CD blank media
2006	Introduction of DVD-Rs blank media
2008	Introduction of flash drives and memory cards
2009	Introduction of Flash TV media player
2012	Launch of Amkette Acoustix Lab
2012	Launch of EvoTV smart TV platform
2015	Launch of Evo GamePad Pro
2016	Launch of Amkette Evo Gamepad Pro 2
2016	Launch of Evo TV 2 4K
2017	Launch of Evo TV 3 4K
2019	Launch of Evo gamepad pro 4 with Instant Play
2020	Introduction of EvoFox Gaming Accessories
2021	Introduction of EvoFox Game box

== Projects ==
- Android Gaming Evo Gamepad – bluetooth controller that allows console style gaming on mobile phones combined with the Android Evo Gaming app.
- Apple certified Mfi cable – launched in December 2014, certified with Apple in two variations, 8 pin (for iPhone 5/5c/5s/6/6Plus) and 32 pin (for 3g/4/4s)
- Trubeats Tango – launched in November 2014, a headphone with a sharing jack (aux out)
- EvoTV – launched mid-2012; a range of connected TV devices that converge web and multimedia features onto a TV
- Amkette Acoustix – a lab within the Amkette R&D wing focussing on developing new sound drivers for headphones and headsets
- EvoFox Gaming – Amkette introduced the EvoFox Gaming Accessories with the launch of the EvoFox Fireblade TKL gaming keyboard in 2020. Amkette's flagship product Evo Game Box TV and Evo Gamepad Pro 4 falls under the same category.

== Products ==
=== Peripherals ===
The company manufactures computer peripherals such as keyboards and mouse, USB hubs, card readers, and HDMI cables. In early 2010, the company entered the wireless segment, comprising keyboards and mice/mouse that run on either bluetooth or wireless spectrum technology.

=== Audio ===
The company makes headphones and headsets that run on Bluetooth and wireless spectrum technology such as Air Budz and Urban series.

=== Accessories ===
Amkette also makes smartphone accessories.

=== Multimedia devices ===
The company manufactures multimedia devices that work on Android platforms and can be connected to a TV. Amkette began development and marketing of media players in late 2009, by introducing the Flash TV 720p media player. In early 2011 the company launched FlashTV HD 1080p, which was a Full HD media player. In mid-2012, the company launched a new media player called Amkette EvoTV, which was again a Full HD mediapPlayer powered by Android.
