= Tekpix =

Product from the Brazilian company Tecnomania

Overview
- Maker: Tecno Mania
- Released: 2000

Tekpix (also stylized as TekPix) was a line of technology products from the Brazilian company Tecnomania. It became best known for its multifunctional cameras, which started being sold in the early 2000s, but stopped in 2013 due to the growing popularity of smartphones. The Tekpix TV announcer, "Juarez from Tekpix," became a meme for his catchphrases, such as "Let's talk about good things," and for claiming that the Tekpix was the best-selling camera in Brazil; however, this was never proven. The line also included an Android tablet, the i-TVWF7x-4.0, released in 2013. The products received negative reviews regarding low quality and high price, with several comparisons being made with other products of lower value and better quality by technology sites.

== History ==
There are few sources regarding the origins of Tekpix. On Agora É Tarde and The Noite with Danilo Gentili, the Tekpix advertiser on television, Juarez Aparecido Pontes Fernandes, known as "Juarez from Tekpix", revealed his history before being hired as an advertiser for the products.

The advertisement in popular TV programs, the popular way of selling, and the payment facilities must have attracted many people who were not even thinking about buying a device of this kind. It was not necessary to have a bank account or proof of income to purchase the product. Moreover, the payment could be made from a down payment, plus many monthly parcels plus some quarterly ones, which gave the impression of being cheaper than the competitors.

— Taysa Coelho for TechTudo, about the Tekpix ad and payment method

Around 2001, Juarez was working in a call center for the group that now owns Tecnomania; at the time, neither this company nor Tekpix existed. Juarez said he was the most hyperactive in the call center, and was always the record salesman; he said his secret was "focus. So the president of the group brought Juarez into his office and asked him to sell Tekpix on television. The Tekpix was made in China, but the concept was Tecnomania's. (Note: Ana Nemes, in an article for TecMundo, said: "Tekpix is just the commercial name given to a generic camera made in China and imported to Brazil by Tecnomania".) Juarez said that the success of the product was so great that the manufacturer started making only Tekpix cameras. He stated that there was a time when 1,200 to 1,300 Tekpix products were sold per day, and that the popularity of the cameras "exploded outside the big centers [...] that big audience was from the countryside." In television ads, Juarez became known for his catchphrases "Let's talk about something good, let's talk about Tekpix" and "No need to put your hand in your pocket", becoming a meme.

The TV commercial claimed that Tekpix was the best-selling camera in Brazil, but this fact was never proven. The advertisement also stated that whoever bought the Tekpix would receive a surprise gift. On The Noite with Danilo Gentili, it was revealed that the gift changed over time, but some of them were a case to store the camera, battery charger and free shipping. In 2013, Tecnomania released an Android tablet from the Tekpix line, the i-TVWF7x-4.0. Initially, Tekpix cameras offered fewer features, but it came to support up to nine features in 2012, and the latest Tekpix model filmed in Full HD (1080p). Nine different camera models were sold until the cameras stopped being marketed in 2013; according to Juarez, this was due to the growing popularity of smartphones, so "there was no longer any point in you marketing a digital camera." He reported having every Tekpix model ever made. Even years after Tekpix was discontinued, Juarez said he wes still known as "Juarez from Tekpix." On The Noite, he commented:

I can sell a helicopter, I can sell a yacht, a mansion, and I will [continue to be] the "Juarez from Tekpix". Which is the greatest pride of my life. [...] I want to die known this way.

== Reception ==
You don't need much research to know that the Tekpix is too expensive for what it offers. Even though you can pay it in installments up to 12 months without interest, the price is still much higher than a simple compact camera that you can find for less than 400 reais - from brands like Sony, Samsung and Nikon - with much better quality.

— Ana Nemes for TecMundo, about Tekpix price and quality

In general, Tekpix products have received negative reviews, especially for their high price and low quality. Ana Nemes, at TecMundo, wrote an article especially about the price of Tekpix cameras, showing other camera models that, according to her, had better quality and price. She also compared the DV-569 model with a camera from the Chinese company Winait: "with some research you can connect the equipment to a Chinese company called Winait, which exports electronic devices to the rest of the world. [...] the models are practically the same and it is possible to affirm that, if they are not the same device, they are at least made by the same manufacturer." This Winait model was sold for $70, but would arrive in Brazil for over a R$1000. Finally, she noted the low rating of the seller, Tecnomania, on the complaint site Reclame Aqui.

In a post about Tekpix curiosities, Taysa Coelho told TechTudo that the I-HD18 model was sold in late 2012 for 3,516 reais, while a Samsung mirrorless model was sold for around 1,400 reais, only. In a similar way, Misael Amaral, writing for the same site, noted that the Tekpix tablet, the i-TVWF7x-4.0, was twice the price of an iPad 4. He said, "The R$3,000 value is hard to justify [...] the device certainly owes innovation and justification for its high value."

In 2012, Renan Hamann published to TecMundo the article "The impressive numbers of the Tekpix", where he showed an infographic comparing the device with others of its kind. He commented:

We did a very quick analysis of other products that could fulfill the same needs and found that it was possible to purchase several different electronics and still save a little more than R$ 1000. It is worth saying that the research was very shallow and we did not go after lower prices.

The infographic compares the price of the Tekpix with other "big name" cameras on the market, such as Canon, Nikon and Sony, as well as the price per megapixel. The survey also answered the question, "How much would the 9 functions cost on separate devices?", coming up with savings of over 1000 reais. Finally, it was answered "what can you buy with the price of a Tekpix?", generating answers such as "11,000 paçocas."

=== Analysis of the i-DV12 model ===
Wikerson Landim from TecMundo and Gustavo Ats from TechTudo reviewed the i-DV12 model, which was sold as a seven-in-one multimedia device: camcorder, photo camera, voice recorder, webcam, flash drive, MP3 and MP4 player.

About the camera functionality, Wikerson noted that despite the 12-megapixel resolution, this number is achieved via interpolation, and effectively the maximum resolution of the camera is 5 megapixels; Gustavo noted that this interpolation "increases the amount of flaws and glitches in the image." Wikerson concluded that the function "does not fulfill the needs [...] The final quality of the images is not the best, but the result is less compromised than in the case of videos." Gustavo said that the images "present[ed] little sharpness and a lot of noise," and commented on using the camera at night: "the camera flash bursts with too much light, causing a huge white out in self-portraits, for example. Without flash, the camera is useless even in well-lit environments. The noise is also huge."

The camcorder functionality also received criticism. Gustavo said that "the videos come out with the quality worse than cell phone cameras with few pixels [...] the video generated disappoints even when shown on a small display." Wikerson also heavily criticized the feature, saying that "the maximum camera resolution for capturing videos is lower than that of a smartphone camera whose resolution is less than 1 megapixel. [...] The final result of the videos ends up being as basic as possible, with images full of noise and with poor definition." The Tekpix can also be used as a webcam by connecting it to the computer. About this function, Wikerson said that the quality was very basic, "after all it is a VGA camera that has practically no features at all." Similarly, Gustavo said that "The quality [...] is similar to any cheap webcam you can find on the market. There is not much to speak of this way in the Tekpix, after all it is mediocre quality."

Wikerson stated that the voice recorder option is the one that would possibly disappoint the consumer the most. The reviewer said that this function would only be workable if the user recorded their own voice, like a microphone. He said that "The audio quality is terrible, and from 4 meters away it is already practically impossible to understand anything from the recording." Gustavo did not analyze this feature in his review. The MP3 Player feature received more positive reviews compared to the others. Wikerson noted that the camera comes along with a headset that is "extremely simple, but fulfills its function." He said that the audio quality "does not go beyond the basics," while Gustavo said that it is "acceptable [...] similar to those low-cost MP3 Players," and said that as an MP3 Player, "the model delivers what it promises." Regarding the MP4 Player, both said that the small two-inch camera screen is not a good option. Wikerson noted that "there is no kind of brightness and image contrast control," while Gustavo wrote that "some heavier videos crash the camera."

Gustavo reviewed the camera's flash drive function, which "[...] works. That's all. [...] it's faster than most of the Chinese flash drives we find on the market." Wikerson said that the i-DV12's internal storage of 32 MB "is practically non-existent," but noted that the model supports SD cards of up to 4 GB, "which makes the situation a little better." Gustavo said that, in reality, "the pendrive function is a 'card reader' function, after all the memory used to read and write files is precisely that of the card inside the machine."

Finally, both agreed that the i-DV12 was overpriced. Wikerson concluded his review by saying that "Costing much more than similar devices and performing poorly functions that intermediate smartphones are capable of doing more efficiently, the Tekpix i-DV12 is certainly not among the best options in its category for the consumer." Gustavo gave the product a rating of 4/10.
