= Simputer =

Linux-based handheld computer

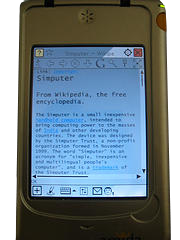
- Manufacturer: Encore · Picopeta
- Type: Handheld computer
- Lifespan: since 2002
- Media: Smart card USB storage devices
- Operating system: Linux
- CPU: StrongARM SA-1110 206 MHz <0.4 W
- Memory: 64 MB
- Display: 3.8" 320 x 240 LCD screen (B&W/STN/TFT) displaying greyscale/4096/65536 cols
- Input: 320 x 240px touchscreen USB keyboard
- Touchpad: Entire screen
- Connectivity: Infrared · USB devices
- Power: Lithium-ion battery
- Dimensions: 142mm x 72mm x 20mm 206 gm

The Simputer is a self-contained, open hardware Linux-based handheld computer that was first released in 2002, developed in, and primarily distributed within India. The product was envisioned as a low-cost alternative to personal computers. The Simputer project had the initial goal of selling 50,000 units, but only sold about 4,000 units by 2005, and has been called a failure by news sources.

== Design and hardware ==
The device was designed by the Simputer Trust, a non-profit organization formed in November 1999 by seven Indian scientists and engineers led by Dr. Swami Manohar. The word "Simputer" is an acronym for "simple, inexpensive and multilingual people's computer", and is a trademark of the Simputer Trust. The device includes text-to-speech software and runs the Linux operating system. Similar in appearance to the PalmPilot class of handheld computers, the touch sensitive screen is operated on with a stylus; simple handwriting recognition software is provided by the program Tapatap.

The Simputer Trust licensed two manufacturers to build the devices, Encore Software, which has also built the Mobilis for Corporate/Educational purposes and the SATHI for Defence purposes, and PicoPeta Simputers, which released a consumer product named the Amida Simputer.

The device features include touchscreen, smart card, Serial port, and USB connections, and an Infrared Data Association (IrDA) port. It was released in both greyscale and color versions.

The hardware specifications are licensed under the Simputer General Public License (SGPL), a public copyright license.

== Software ==
The Simputer uses the Linux kernel (2.4.18 Kernel as of July 2005), and the Alchemy Window Manager (only the Amida Simputer). Software packages include: Scheduling, Calendar, Voice Recording and Playback, simple spreadsheet application, Internet and network connectivity, Web browsing and email, an e-Library, games, and support for Java ME, DotGNU (a free software implementation of .NET), and Flash.

In addition, both licensees developed custom applications for microbanking, traffic police, and medical applications.

== Deployments ==
In 2004, Simputers were used by the government of Karnataka to automate the process of land records procurement. Simputers were also used in a project in Chhattisgarh for the purpose of e-education. In 2005, they were used in a variety of applications, such as automobile engine diagnostics (Mahindra & Mahindra in Mumbai), tracking of iron-ore movement from mine pithead to shipping point (Dempo, Goa), Microcredit (Sanghamitra, Mysore), Electronic Money Transfer between UK and Ghana (XK8 Systems, UK), and others. In recent times, the Simputer has seen deployment by the police force to track traffic offenders and issue traffic tickets.

== Commercial production ==
Pilot production of the Simputer started in September 2002. In 2004, the Amida Simputer became commercially available for ₹12450 and up (approximately US$240). The prices for Amida Simputer vary depending on the screen type (monochrome or colour).

By 2006, both licensees had stopped actively marketing their Simputer devices. PicoPeta was acquired by Geodesic Information Systems (a developer of communication and collaboration systems) in 2005.

== See also ==
- Akash/Sakshat tablet
- BOSS Linux developed by C-DAC
- Digital divide
- Longmeng or Dragon Dream is a Chinese low-cost computer being designed to cost €100
- VIA pc-1 Initiative
- ZX81 the first million selling low cost (£69/$99.95) Computer.
