= Jumbogram =

Large packets in IPv6

In packet-switched computer networks, a jumbogram (portmanteau of jumbo and datagram) is an internet-layer packet exceeding the standard maximum transmission unit (MTU) of the underlying network technology. In contrast, large packets for link-layer technologies are referred to as jumbo frames.

The Total Length field of IPv4 and the Payload Length field of IPv6 each have a size of 16 bits, thus allowing data of up to 65535octets. This theoretical limit for the Internet Protocol (IP) MTU, however, is reached only on networks that have a suitable link layer infrastructure. While IPv4 has no facilities to exceed its theoretical IP MTU limit, the designers of IPv6 have provided a protocol extension to permit packets of larger size. Thus, in the context of IPv6, a jumbogram is understood as an IPv6 packet carrying a payload larger than 65535octets.

== IPv6 jumbograms ==
An optional feature of IPv6, the jumbo payload option, allows the exchange of packets with payloads of up to one byte less than 4 GiB (2^{32} − 1 = 4,294,967,295 bytes), by making use of a 32-bit length field. Historically, transport layer protocols, such as the Transmission Control Protocol (TCP) and the User Datagram Protocol (UDP), include data size parameters limited to only 16 bits (length, urgent data pointer). The support for IPv6 jumbograms required a redesign in all Transport Layer protocols. The jumbo payload option and the transport-layer modifications are described in RFC 2675. Since after a number of years IPv6 jumbograms have not been widely deployed, some have proposed their removal from the standards.

== See also ==
- Maximum Segment Size (MSS)
