= MAC service data unit =

MAC service data unit (media access control service data unit, MSDU) is the service data unit in the IEEE 802 reference model of network architecture. This data unit is exchanged at the interface between the media access control (MAC) sub-layer and the layer immediately above it, typically the (optional) logical link control (LLC) sub-layer. The LLC and MAC sub-layers are collectively referred to as the data link layer (DLL).

== See also ==
- MAC protocol data unit
- Packet segmentation
- Packet aggregation
