= Maximum segment size =

Transmission Control Protocol parameter

The maximum segment size (MSS) is a parameter of the Options field of the TCP header that specifies the largest amount of data, specified in bytes, that a computer or communications device can receive in a single TCP segment. It does not count the TCP header or the IP header (unlike, for example, the MTU for IP datagrams). The IP datagram containing a TCP segment may be self-contained within a single packet, or it may be reconstructed from several fragmented pieces; either way, the MSS limit applies to the total amount of data contained in the final, reconstructed TCP segment.

To avoid fragmentation in the IP layer, a host must specify the maximum segment size as equal to the largest IP datagram that the host can handle minus the IP and TCP header sizes. Though there is no minimum required MSS defined in IETF RFCs, there is a minimum MTU, and so a default MSS is calculated by subtracting the minimum IP and TCP header sizes from the MTU. For example, IPv4 hosts typically default to an MSS of 536 octets (= 576 − 20 − 20) and IPv6 hosts generally are able to handle an MSS of 1220 octets (= 1280 − 40 − 20).

Small MSS values will reduce or eliminate IP fragmentation but will result in higher overhead.

Each direction of data flow can use a different MSS.

For most computer users, the MSS option is established by the operating system.

TCP options size (Variable 0–320 bits, in units of 32 bits) must be deducted from MSS size if TCP options are enabled. For example, TCP Time Stamps are enabled by default on Linux platforms.

== Default value ==
The default TCP Maximum Segment Size for IPv4 is 536. For IPv6 it is 1220. Where a host wishes to set the maximum segment size to a value other than the default, the maximum segment size is specified as a TCP option, initially in the TCP SYN packet during the TCP handshake. The value cannot be changed after the connection is established.

== Inter-layer communication ==
In order to notify MSS to the other end, an inter-layer communication is done as follows:

- The Network Driver (ND) or interface should know the Maximum transmission unit (MTU) of the directly attached network.
- The IP should ask the Network Driver for the Maximum Transmission Unit.
- The TCP should ask the IP for the Maximum Datagram Data Size (MDDS). This is the MTU minus the IP header length (MDDS = MTU − IPHdrLen).
- When opening a connection, TCP can send an MSS option with the value equal to: MDDS − TCPHdrLen. In other words, the MSS value to send is: MSS = MTU − TCPHdrLen − IPHdrLen

While sending TCP segments to the other end, an inter-layer communication is done as follows:

- TCP should determine the Maximum Segment Data Size (MSDS) from either the default or the received value of the MSS option.
- TCP should determine if source fragmentation is possible (by asking the IP) and desirable.
  - If so, TCP may hand to IP, segments (including the TCP header) up to MSDS + TCPHdrLen.
  - If not, TCP may hand to IP, segments (including the TCP header) up to the lesser of (MSDS + TCPHdrLen) and MDDS.
- IP checks the length of data passed to it by TCP. If the length is less than or equal MDDS, IP attaches the IP header and hands it to the ND. Otherwise, the IP must do source fragmentation.

== MSS and MTU ==
MSS is sometimes conflated with MTU/PMTU, which is a characteristic of the underlying link layer, while MSS applies specifically to TCP and hence the transport layer. The two are similar in that they limit the maximum size of the payload carried by their respective protocol data unit (frame for MTU, TCP segment for MSS), and related since MSS cannot exceed the MTU for its underlying link (taking into account the overhead of any headers added by the layers below TCP). However, the difference, in addition to applying to different layers, is that (1) MSS can have a different value in either direction and that (2) frames exceeding the MTU may cause packets (which encapsulate segments) to be fragmented by the network layer, while segments exceeding the MSS are simply discarded.

== See also ==
- Path MTU Discovery
