= Service data unit =

Data passed down to a lower layer of the OSI model, yet to be encapsulated

In Open Systems Interconnection (OSI) terminology, a service data unit (SDU) is a unit of data that has been passed down from an OSI layer or sublayer to a lower layer. This unit of data (SDU) has not yet been encapsulated into a protocol data unit (PDU) by the lower layer. That SDU is then encapsulated into the lower layer's PDU and the process continues until reaching the PHY, physical, or lowest layer of the OSI stack.

The SDU can also be thought of as a set of data that is sent by a user of the services of a given layer, and is transmitted semantically unchanged to a peer service user.

== SDU and PDU ==
It differs from a PDU in that the PDU specifies the data that will be sent to the peer protocol layer at the receiving end, as opposed to being sent to a lower layer.

The SDU accepted by any given layer (n) from layer (n+1) above, is a PDU of the layer (n+1) above. In effect the SDU is the 'payload' of a given PDU. The layer (n) may add headers or trailers, or both, to the SDU and may do other kinds of reformatting, recoding, splitting or transformations on the data, forming one or more layer (n) PDUs. The added headers or trailers and other possible changes are part of the process that makes it possible to get data from a source to a destination. Layer (n) may also generate additional layer (n) PDUSs. Each unit of data that layer (n) gives to layer (n-1) below is in turn handed down as a layer (n-1) SDU.

When the PDU of layer (n+1), plus any metadata layer (n) would add; would exceed the maximum size a layer-n PDU can be (called layer (n)'s maximum transmission unit); the SDU must be split into multiple payloads for layer (n); a process known as fragmentation.

=== MAC SDU ===
MAC SDUS or MSDUS are data units transmitted between other Media access controllers on a lower OSI Layer. The PDU counterpart MAC PDU that does the same thing but on the same OSI Layer. When there are larger MAC PDU's as MAC SDU's in the system, the MAC PDU includes more MAC SDU's, because of packet aggregation. If the MAC PDU's are smaller then the MAC SDU's includes more MAC PDU's, because of packet segmentation.

== See also ==
- Federal Standard 1037C
