= Maximum transmission unit =

Size of largest allowed packet on a network segment

In computer networking, the maximum transmission unit (MTU) is the size of the largest protocol data unit (PDU) that can be communicated in a single network layer transaction. The MTU relates to, but is not identical to the maximum frame size that can be transported on the data link layer, e.g., Ethernet frame.

Larger MTU is associated with reduced overhead. Smaller MTU values can reduce network delay. In many cases, MTU is dependent on underlying network capabilities and must be adjusted manually or automatically so as not to exceed these capabilities. MTU parameters may appear in association with a communications interface or standard. Some systems may decide MTU at connect time, e.g., using Path MTU Discovery.

== Applicability ==
MTUs apply to communications protocols and network layers. The MTU is specified in terms of bytes or octets of the largest PDU that the layer can pass onwards. MTU parameters usually appear in association with a communications interface (NIC, serial port, etc.). Standards (Ethernet, for example) can fix the size of an MTU; or systems (such as point-to-point serial links) may decide MTU at connect time.

Underlying data link and physical layers usually add overhead to the network layer data to be transported, so for a given maximum frame size of a medium, one needs to subtract the amount of overhead to calculate that medium's MTU. For example, with Ethernet, the maximum frame size is 1518 bytes, 18 bytes of which are overhead (header and frame check sequence), resulting in an MTU of 1500 bytes.

== Tradeoffs ==
A larger MTU brings greater efficiency because each network packet carries more user data while protocol overheads, such as headers or underlying per-packet delays, remain fixed; the resulting higher efficiency means an improvement in bulk protocol throughput. A larger MTU also requires processing of fewer packets for the same amount of data. In some systems, per-packet processing can be a critical performance limitation.

However, this gain is not without a downside. Large packets occupy a link for more time than a smaller packet, causing greater delays to subsequent packets, and increasing network delay and delay variation. For example, a 1500-byte packet, the largest allowed by Ethernet at the network layer, ties up a 14.4k modem for about one second.

Large packets are also problematic in the presence of communications errors. If no forward error correction is used, corruption of a single bit in a packet requires that the entire packet be retransmitted, which can be costly. At a given bit error rate, larger packets are more susceptible to corruption. Their greater payload makes retransmissions of larger packets take longer. Despite the negative effects on retransmission duration, large packets can still have a net positive effect on end-to-end TCP performance.

== Internet protocol ==
The Internet protocol suite was designed to work over many different networking technologies, each of which may use packets of different sizes. While a host will know the MTU of its own interface and possibly that of its peers (from initial handshakes), it will not initially know the lowest MTU in a chain of links to other peers. Another potential problem is that higher-level protocols may create packets larger than even the local link supports.

IPv4 allows fragmentation, which divides the datagram into pieces, each small enough to accommodate a specified MTU limitation. This fragmentation process takes place at the internet layer. The fragmented packets are marked so that the IP layer of the destination host knows it should reassemble the packets into the original datagram.

All fragments of a packet must arrive for the packet to be considered received. If the network drops any fragment, the entire packet is lost.

When the number of packets that must be fragmented or the number of fragments is great, fragmentation can cause unreasonable or unnecessary overhead. For example, various tunneling situations may exceed the MTU by very little as they add just a header's worth of data. The addition is small, but each packet now has to be sent in two fragments, the second of which carries very little payload. The same amount of payload is being moved, but every intermediate router has to forward twice as many packets.

The Internet Protocol requires that hosts must be able to process IP datagrams of at least 576 bytes (for IPv4) or 1280 bytes (for IPv6). However, this does not preclude link layers with an MTU smaller than this minimum MTU from conveying IP data. For example, according to IPv6's specification, if a particular link layer cannot deliver an IP datagram of 1280 bytes in a single frame, then the link layer must provide its own fragmentation and reassembly mechanism, separate from the IP fragmentation mechanism, to ensure that a 1280-byte IP datagram can be delivered, intact, to the IP layer.

=== MTUs for common media ===
In the context of Internet Protocol, MTU refers to the maximum size of an IP packet that can be transmitted without fragmentation over a given medium. The size of an IP packet includes IP headers but excludes headers from the link layer. In the case of an Ethernet frame this adds a protocol overhead of 18 bytes, or 22 bytes with an IEEE 802.1Q tag for VLAN tagging or class of service.

The MTU should not be confused with the minimum datagram size (in one piece or in fragments) that all hosts must be prepared to accept. This is 576 bytes for IPv4 and 1280 bytes for IPv6.

Media for IP transport	Maximum transmission unit (bytes)	Notes
Internet IPv4 path MTU	At least 68, max of 64 KiB	Systems may use Path MTU Discovery to find the actual path MTU. Routing from larger MTU to smaller MTU causes IP fragmentation.
Internet IPv6 path MTU	At least 1280, max of 64 KiB, but optional jumbograms go up to 4 GiB	Systems should use Path MTU Discovery to find the actual path MTU, unless the minimum MTU (1280 bytes) is not exceeded. Jumbograms are packets with a Jumbo Payload option to allow transmission of payloads between 65,536 and 4,294,967,295 octets in length.
X.25	Minimal 576 (sending) or 1600 (receiving)	
Ethernet v2	1500	Nearly all IP over Ethernet implementations use the Ethernet II frame format.
Ethernet with LLC and SNAP	1492	
Ethernet jumbo frames	1501–9202 or more	The limit varies by vendor. For correct interoperation, frames should be no larger than the maximum frame size supported by any device on the network segment.
PPPoE v2	1492	Ethernet II MTU (1500) less PPPoE header (8); extensions exist
DS-Lite over PPPoE	1452	Ethernet II MTU (1500) less PPPoE header (8) and IPv6 header (40)
PPPoE jumbo frames	1493–9190 or more	Ethernet Jumbo Frame MTU (1501–9198) less PPPoE header (8)
IEEE 802.11 Wi-Fi (WLAN)	2304	The maximum MSDU size is 2304 before encryption. WEP will add 8 bytes, WPA-TKIP 20 bytes, and WPA2-CCMP 16 bytes. See also Frame aggregation mechanisms in 802.11n.
Token Ring (802.5)	4464	
FDDI	4352	

=== Ethernet maximum frame size ===
The IP MTU and Ethernet maximum frame size are configured separately. In Ethernet switch configuration, MTU may refer to the Ethernet maximum frame size. In Ethernet-based routers, MTU normally refers to the IP MTU. If jumbo frames are allowed in a network, the IP MTU should also be adjusted upwards to take advantage of this.

Since the IP packet is carried by an Ethernet frame, the Ethernet frame has to be larger than the IP packet. With the normal untagged Ethernet frame overhead of 18 bytes and the 1500-byte payload, the Ethernet maximum frame size is 1518 bytes. If a 1500-byte IP packet is to be carried over a tagged Ethernet connection, the Ethernet frame maximum size needs to be 1522 bytes due to the larger size of an 802.1Q tagged frame. 802.3ac increases the standard Ethernet maximum frame size to accommodate this.

=== Path MTU Discovery ===
The Internet Protocol defines the path MTU of an Internet transmission path as the smallest MTU supported by any of the hops on the path between a source and destination. Put another way, the path MTU is the largest packet size that can traverse this path without suffering fragmentation.

Path MTU Discovery is a technique for determining the path MTU between two IP hosts, defined for both IPv4 and IPv6. It works by sending packets with the DF (don't fragment) option in the IP header set. Any device along the path whose MTU is smaller than the packet will drop such packets and send back an ICMP Destination Unreachable (Datagram Too Big) message which indicates its MTU. This information allows the source host to reduce its assumed path MTU appropriately. The process repeats until the MTU becomes small enough to traverse the entire path without fragmentation.

Standard Ethernet supports an MTU of 1500 bytes, and Ethernet implementations supporting jumbo frames allow for an MTU up to 9000 bytes. However, border protocols like PPPoE will reduce this. Path MTU Discovery exposes the difference between the MTU seen by Ethernet end-nodes and the Path MTU.

Unfortunately, increasing numbers of networks drop ICMP traffic (for example, to prevent denial-of-service attacks), which prevents path MTU discovery from working. Packetization Layer Path MTU Discovery is a Path MTU Discovery technique which responds more robustly to ICMP filtering. In an IP network, the path from the source address to the destination address may change in response to various events (load-balancing, congestion, outages, etc.) and this could result in the path MTU changing (sometimes repeatedly) during a transmission, which may introduce further packet drops before the host finds a new reliable MTU.

A failure of Path MTU Discovery carries the possible result of making some sites behind badly configured firewalls unreachable. A connection with mismatched MTU may work for low-volume data but fail as soon as a host sends a large block of data. For example, with Internet Relay Chat, a connecting client might see the initial messages up to and including the initial ping (sent by the server as an anti-spoofing measure), but get no response after that. This is because the large set of welcome messages sent at that point are packets that exceed the path MTU. One can possibly work around this, depending on which part of the network one controls; for example, one can change the MSS (maximum segment size) in the initial packet that sets up the TCP connection at one's firewall.

== In other contexts ==
MTU is sometimes used to describe the maximum PDU sizes in communication layers other than the network layer.

- Cisco Systems and MikroTik use L2 MTU for the maximum frame size.
- Dell/Force10 use MTU for the maximum frame size.
- Hewlett-Packard used just MTU for the maximum frame size including the optional IEEE 802.1Q tag.
- Juniper Networks use several MTU terms: Physical Interface MTU (L3 MTU plus some unspecified protocol overhead), Logical Interface MTU (consistent with IETF MTU) and Maximum MTU (maximum configurable frame size for jumbo frames).

The transmission of a packet on a physical network segment that is larger than the segment's MTU is known as jabber. This is almost always caused by faulty devices. Network switches and some repeater hubs have a built-in capability to detect when a device is jabbering.
