= IQRF =

IQRF is a technology for wireless packet-oriented communication via radio frequency (RF) in sub-GHz ISM bands. It is intended for general use where wireless connectivity is needed, either point-to-point or in complex networks, e.g. for telemetry, industrial control, automation of buildings and cities and Internet of Things. Fully open functionality depends solely on a user-specific application.

Basic IQRF communication device is a transceiver module (TR) including MCU with built-in operating system (OS) implementing link layer and network layer supporting Mesh networking utilizing IQMESH protocol. The application software can be written directly under OS in C language. Unlike the solution stack used, e.g. by Zigbee, only the application program is compiled while in development.

Higher communication level (transport layer) is DPA. It is an optional open protocol and framework enabling control by sending commands and receiving responses via standard wired interface (UART or SPI) or via RF. DPA is implemented as a ready-to-use software plug-in called hardware profile (HWP) to be uploaded into the transceiver. Then no programming is needed. However, it is possible to modify the existing HWP functionality by a user-specific Custom DPA handler programmed in C. The transceivers supporting DPA are called DCTR (data controlled transceivers).

IQRF connectivity for 3rd party devices programmable in C or Java is supported by open source development SDK package IQRF SDK.

Gateways with datalogger option and LAN connectivity can utilize the cloud server providing plug-and-play worldwide access to end IQRF wireless devices.

IQRF Alliance is an international community of developers, manufacturers, system integrators and others engaged in wireless connectivity based on IQRF technology. Its main goal is the interoperability of products with DCTRs inside.

== Features ==
- Low speed, low power and low data volumes
- Low power modes with sub-μA consumption in standby and 15 μA while receiving
- Packet-oriented RF, up to 64 B/packet
- Sub-GHz RF bands: 868 MHz, 916 MHz (software-selectable) or 433 MHz, multichannel
- GFSK modulation
- Bit rate 19.836 kbit/s
- RF output power up to 12.5 mW
- Range per hop: tens of meters in buildings, hundreds of meters in free space, up to several kilometers in special arrangements
- Up to 240 hops per packet
- Up to 65 000 devices in one network under OS, up to 240 devices under DPA
- Fast response: data collected from about 230 nodes by single command in about 30 s
- Automated building of a network
- Wireless upgrades of all SW (OS, HWP, Custom handler and application code) simultaneously for all devices in a network
- No license and carrier fees
