= Packet concatenation =

Packet concatenation is a computer networking optimization that coalesces multiple packets under a single header. The use of packet containment reduces the overhead at the physical and link layers.

== See also ==
- Frame aggregation
- Packet aggregation
