= Frame aggregation =

Sending network frames in one transmission to reduce overhead

Frame aggregation is a feature that allows communicating on a shared link or channel, typically a TDM shared channel, with a minimum time slot that for efficiency reasons benefits from filling the time slot with data, i.e. sending two or more data frames in a single transmission. The feature is an important part of the IEEE 802.11e, 802.11n and 802.11ac wireless LAN standards that increases throughput with frame aggregation. The MoCA protocol used for communication over coaxial networks also implements frame aggregation for the same reason. In protocol standards and implementations, the frame aggregation is usually combined with segmentation and reassembly of frames so that the time slots can be filled to 100%. E.g., an aggregation MAC PDU can be filled with 3.5 frames to ensure the time slot is utilized to 100% and in the next time slot the rest of the fragmented frame is sent together with any additional complete frames.

The article uses IEEE 802.11 as a basis for explanations as it is probably the most wide spread and commonly known shared channel communication solution, but the protocol features for frame aggregation are common to many other communication protocols that utilize a shared communication channel, e.g. MAC service data unit (MSDU, e.g. an Ethernet frame) aggregation and MAC protocol data unit (MPDU, e.g. IEEE 802.11n frame) naming is also used in MoCA.

Every frame transmitted by an 802.11 device has a significant amount of overhead, including radio level headers, media access control (MAC) frame fields, inter-frame spacing, and acknowledgement of transmitted frames. At the highest data rates, this overhead can consume more bandwidth than the payload data frame. To address this issue, the 802.11n standard defines two types of frame aggregation: MAC service data unit (MSDU) aggregation and MAC protocol data unit (MPDU) aggregation. Both types group several data frames into one large frame. Because management information needs to be specified only once per frame, the ratio of payload data to the total volume of data is higher, allowing higher throughput.

== MSDU aggregation ==
MAC service data unit (MSDU) aggregation relies on the fact that most mobile access points and most mobile client protocol stacks use Ethernet as their "native" frame format. It collects Ethernet frames to be transmitted to one or multiple destinations and wraps them in a single 802.11n frame. This is efficient because Ethernet headers are much shorter than 802.11 headers.

An aggregate MSDU (A-MSDU) contains only MSDUs whose destination address (DA) and sender address (SA) parameter values map to the same receiver address (RA) and transmitter address (TA) values, i.e., all the MSDUs are intended to be received by a single receiver, and necessarily they are all transmitted by the same transmitter.

NOTE: It is possible to have different DA and SA parameter values in A-MSDU subframe headers of the same A-MSDU, as long as they all map to the same Address 1 and Address 2 parameter values. (reference: IEEE std 802_11-2012)

== MPDU aggregation ==
MAC protocol data unit (MPDU) aggregation also collects Ethernet frames to be transmitted to a single destination, but it wraps each frame in an 802.11n MAC header. Normally this is less efficient than MSDU aggregation but is actually more efficient in environments with high error rates, because of a mechanism called Selective Block acknowledgement. This mechanism allows each of the aggregated data frames to be individually acknowledged or retransmitted if affected by an error.

== See also ==
- Block acknowledgement
- IEEE 802.11
- Packet aggregation
