= Segmentation and reassembly =

Arranging data into cells in an ATM network

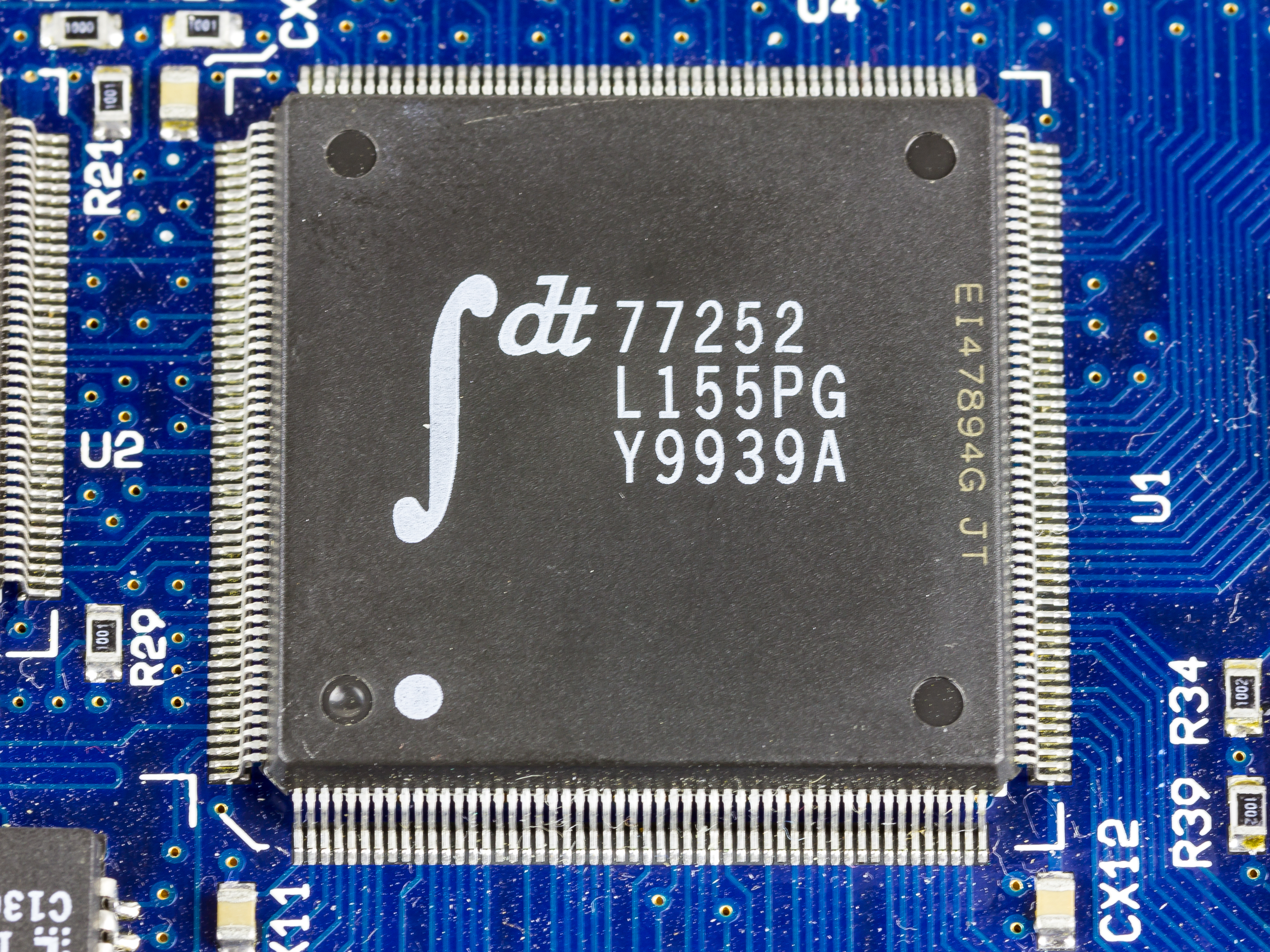
IDT 77155, a 155 Mbit/s ATM SAR controller chip

Segmentation and reassembly (SAR) is the process used to fragment and reassemble variable length packets into fixed length cells so as to allow them to be transported across Asynchronous Transfer Mode (ATM) networks or other cell based infrastructures. Since ATM's payload is only 48 bytes, nearly every packet from any other protocol has to be processed in this way. Thus, it is an essential process for any ATM node. It is usually handled by a dedicated chip, called the SAR.

The process is conceptually simple: an incoming packet from another protocol to be transmitted across the ATM network is chopped up into segments that fit into 48-byte chunks carried as ATM cell payloads. At the far end, these chunks are fitted back together to reconstitute the original packet.

The process is analogous to the fragmentation of IP packets on reaching an interface with a maximum transmission unit (MTU) less than the packet size and the subsequent reassembly of the original packet once the fragments have reached the original packet's destination.

Since different types of data are encapsulated in different ways, the details of the segmentation process vary according to the type of data being handled. There are several different schemes, referred to as ATM adaptation layers (AALs). The schemes are:

- AAL0 – Raw cells with no special format
- AAL1 – Constant bitrate, circuit emulation (T1, E1, etc.)
- AAL2 – Variable bitrate synchronous traffic, eous traffic, e.g. Frame Relay transport
- AAL5 – Used for most data traffic, such as IP

== See also ==
- Packet segmentation
- Packet aggregation
