= Concatenation (disambiguation) =

Concatenation is a computer programming operation that joins strings together.

Concatenation may also refer to:

- Concatenation (architecture), an architectural composition
- Concatenation of paths, a construction in topology
- Non-RAID drive architectures § Concatenation (SPAN, BIG)
- Concatenated SMS, a way of combining multiple SMS text messages sent to cellular phones
- Packet concatenation, a computer networking optimization that coalesces multiple packets under a single header
- cat (Unix), a Unix command to write the contents of one or more files to the standard output
- "Concatenation", the opening track of Swedish extreme metal band Meshuggah's album Chaosphere
- A technical term in Christian liturgy to refer to combining services which are normally performed at different times of the day

== See also ==
- Catenation, the chemical bonding of atoms of the same element into a chain
