= Quibble =

A quibble may refer to:

- Quibble (computing), a quad nibble
- Quibble (plot device), in narratology
- Quibble, a character in the video game franchise My Singing Monsters

== See also ==
- Pun
- Trivial objections
