= Hexlet =

Hexlet may refer to:

- Soddy's hexlet, in geometry a chain of six spheres, each of which is tangent to both of its neighbors and also to three mutually tangent given spheres
- Hexlet (computing), a group of 128 bits in computing

== See also ==
- Hextet
