= Cisco Express Forwarding =

Layer 3 switching technology

Cisco Express Forwarding (CEF) is an advanced layer 3 switching technology used mainly in large core networks or the Internet to enhance the overall network performance. Although CEF is a proprietary protocol of Cisco, other vendors of multilayer switches or high-capacity routers offer a similar functionality where layer-3 switching or routing is done in hardware (in an ASIC) instead of by software and the (central) CPU.

== Function ==
CEF is mainly used to increase packet switching speed by reducing the overhead and delays introduced by other routing techniques. CEF consists of two key components: The Forwarding Information Base (FIB) and adjacencies.

The FIB is similar to the routing table generated by multiple routing protocols, maintaining only the next-hop address for a particular IP-route.

The adjacency table maintains layer 2 or switching information linked to a particular FIB entry, avoiding the need for an Address Resolution Protocol (ARP) request for each table lookup. There are several types of adjacencies. Some are listed below:

- Cache adjacency: This type of entry contains the correct outbound interface and the correct MAC address for its FIB entry. The MAC address is the IP address's MAC address if the destination's subnet is directly connected to the router, or is the MAC address of the router that the packet needs to be sent to if the destination's subnet is not directly connected to the router currently processing the packet.
- Receive adjacency: This type of entry handles packets whose final destinations include the router itself. This includes packets whose IP addresses are assigned to the router itself, broadcast packets, and multicasts that have set up the router itself as one of the destinations.
- Null adjacency: Handles packets destined to a NULL interface. Packets with FIB entries pointing to NULL adjacencies will normally be dropped.
- Punt adjacency: Deals with packets that require special handling or that cannot be switched by CEF. Such packets are forwarded to the next switching layer (generally fast switching) where they can be processed and hopefully forwarded correctly.
- Glean adjacency: This adjacency is created when the router knows that either the destination IP's subnet is directly connected to the router itself and it does not know that destination device's MAC address, or the router knows the IP address of the router to forward a packet to for a destination, but it does not know that router's MAC address. Packets that trigger this entry will generate an ARP request.
- Discard adjacency: FIB entries pointing to this type of adjacency will be discarded.
- Drop adjacency: Packets pointing to this entry are dropped, but the prefix will be checked.

In order to take full advantage of CEF, it is recommended to use distributed CEF (dCEF), where there is a FIB table on each of the line cards. This avoids the need for querying the main processor or routing table in order to get the next-hop information. Instead, fast switching will be performed on the line card itself.

CEF currently supports Ethernet, Frame Relay, ATM, PPP, FDDI, tunnels, and Cisco HDLC.
