= Trailer (computing) =

Supplemental data placed after a block of data being transmitted

In information technology, a trailer or footer refers to supplemental data (metadata) placed at the end of a block of data being stored or transmitted, which may contain information for the handling of the data block, or simply mark the block's end.

In data transmission, the data following the end of the header and preceding the start of the trailer is called the payload or body.

It is vital that trailer composition follow a clear and unambiguous specification or format, to allow for parsing. If a trailer is not removed properly, or part of the payload is removed thinking it is a trailer, it can cause confusion.

The trailer contains information concerning the destination of a packet being sent over a network. So for instance, in the case of emails, the destination of the email is contained in the trailer.

== Examples ==
- In data transfer, the OSI model's data link layer adds a trailer at the end of frames of the data encapsulation.
