= DoD IPv6 product certification =

Internet protocol

The United States Department of Defense (DoD) Internet Protocol version 6 (IPv6) product certification program began as a mandate from the DoD's Assistant Secretary of Defense for Networks & Information Integration (ASD-NII) in 2005. The program mandates the Joint Interoperability Test Command (JITC) in Fort Huachuca, Arizona, to test and certify IT products for IPv6 capability according to the RFCs outlined in the DoD's IPv6 Standards Profiles for IPv6 Capable Products. Once products are certified for special interoperability, they are added to the DoD's Unified Capabilities Approved Products List (UC APL) for IPv6. This list is used by procurement offices in the DoD and the U.S. Federal agencies for ongoing purchases and acquisitions of IT equipment.

As of February 2009, the DoD ceased the requirement for IPv6-only testing for certification and entry into the Unified Capabilities Approved Products List (UC APL). According to Kris Strance, DoD CIO IPv6 Lead, "The testing of IPv6 is a part of all product evaluations — it is much broader in scope now." The UC APL is now a single consolidated list of products that have completed Interoperability (IO) and Information Assurance (IA) certification.

== DoD IPv6 standards ==
The DoD IPv6 Standards Profiles for IPv6 Capable Products (DoD IPv6 Profile) is the singular “IPv6 Capable” definition in DoD. It is a document that lists the six agreed upon product classes (Host, Router, Layer 3 Switch, Network Appliance, Security Device, and Advanced Server) and their corresponding standards (RFCs). It lists each standard according to its level of requirement:

- MUST: The standard is required to be implemented in the product now.
- SHOULD: The standard is optional, but recommended for implementation.
- SHOULD+: The standard is optional now, but will be required within a short period of time.

== DoD IPv6 generic test plan ==
The JITC uses its publicly available IPv6 Generic Test Plan (GTP) to test each product for its conformance, performance and interoperability of IPv6 according to the DoD IPv6 Profile. The JITC uses a combination of automated testing tools and manual functional test procedures to conduct this testing.

== Process ==
1. The vendor, or Program Manager, must make their intentions known to test by providing the JITC with a Letter of Compliance (LoC). This letter will consist of the product to test, the product class it belongs to, a listing of all of the standards that it implements, and a signature from a Vice President or officer of the company. This is the “gateway” to the testing process.
2. Once the LoC is received, the product is then scheduled for testing.
3. Approximately 6 weeks before the start of testing, the vendor must provide the JITC with funding. This funding must be in the form of a check. The amount is only to charge direct labor hours for testing by the contractor labor support.
4. If the product successfully meets the criteria, it will be entered on the DoD's UC APL for IPv6.
5. An IPv6 Capable Special Interoperability Certification Letter and Report will accompany the entry within 30–60 days after testing.

== IPv6 pre-certification testing advocates ==
There are many companies and organizations that help develop and test products for vendors prior to testing at the JITC. These organizations cannot grant certification, but can conduct pre-testing to ensure a vendor's product will pass the necessary certification. Below is a list of these organizations:

- The University of New Hampshire InterOperability Laboratory - IPv6 Ready Logo testing:

== The IPv6 Ready Logo program ==
The IPv6 Forum has a service called IPv6 Ready Logo. This service represents a qualification program that assures devices have been tested and are IPv6 capable. Once certified, the service grants qualified products to display their logo. In the IPv6 Forum, they present objectives that are to:

- Verify protocol implementation and validate interoperability of IPv6 products.
- Provide access to free self-testing tools.
- Provide IPv6 Ready Logo testing laboratories across the globe whom will be dedicated to providing testing assistance or services.

IPv6 experts suggest only pursuing to purchase devices given the Phase-2 approval or gold logo since they are given the full treatment: The Department of Defense (DoD) is committed to IPv6 and will likely be the first federal organization completely converted to IPv6. They also have a process for qualifying IPv6 equipment.

JITC/DISA The task of certifying IPv6 products was given to the Joint Interoperability Test Command (JITC), part of the Defense Information Systems Agency (DISA). To help standardize IPv6 qualification procedures, the JITC follows what’s called the IPv6 Generic Test Plan. After JITC qualifies a product, it is added to the Unified Capabilities Approved Products List. Fortunately, JITC makes the list available to the public.
