= IP packet =

IP packet may refer to:

- Internet Protocol
- IPv4 packet
- IPv6 packet
