= Physical Layer Convergence Protocol =

Physical Layer Convergence Protocol is the physical layer protocol of several data transmission networks. It is used in the 802.11 standard.
