= Fibre Channel frame =

Protocol data unit of the Fibre Channel protocol

In computer networking, a Fibre Channel frame is the frame of the Fibre Channel protocol. The basic building blocks of an FC connection are the frames. They contain the information to be transmitted (payload), the address of the source and destination ports and link control information. Frames are broadly categorized as

- Data frames
- Link_control frames

Data frames may be used as Link_Data frames and Device_Data frames, link control frames are classified as Acknowledge (ACK) and Link_Response (Busy and Reject) frames. The primary function of the Fabric is to receive the frames from the source port and route them to the destination port. It is the FC-2 layer's responsibility to break the data to be transmitted into frame size, and reassemble the frames.

Each frame begins and ends with a frame delimiter. The frame header immediately follows the Start of Frame (SOF) delimiter. The frame header is used to control link applications, control device protocol transfers, and detect missing or out of order frames. Optional headers may contain further link control information. A maximum 2048 byte long field (payload) contains the information to be transferred from a source N_Port to a destination N_Port. The 4 byte Cyclic Redundancy Check (CRC) precedes the End of Frame (EOF) delimiter. The CRC is used to detect transmission errors. The maximum total frame length is 2148 bytes.

Between successive frames a sequence of (at least) six primitives must be transmitted, sometimes called interframe gap.

General Fibre Channel frame format
Length (bytes)	Content
4	Start of Frame (SOF)
24	Frame Header
0–64	optional headers (ESP, network, association, device)
0–2048	data payload
0–36	necessary fill bytes, optional ESP checksum trailer
4	cyclic redundancy checksum (CRC)
4	End of Frame (EOF)
