= Hextet =

Group of 16 bits

In computing, a hextet, or a chomp, is a sixteen-bit aggregation, or four nibbles. As a nibble is typically notated in hexadecimal format, a hextet consists of 4 hexadecimal digits. A hextet is the unofficial name for each of the 8 blocks in an IPv6 address.

A hextet is also referred to as a segment in some documentation.

== History ==
Bob Bemer suggested the use of hextet for 16-bit groups in 2000. In 2011 an Internet Draft explored various alternatives for hextet, such as quibble, short for "quad nibble". In response to this draft, author Trefor Davies suggested the use of the word chomp because it is in line with the current terminology bit, nibble, byte.

Hextet would more properly describe a 6-bit aggregation, whereas the exact term for 16 bits should be hexadectet, directly related to the term octet (for 8 bits). However, because it is harder to pronounce, the short form hextet is used—in analogy to how hex is commonly used as an abbreviation for hexadecimal in computing. This usage of hex to mean 16 is also in line with the similar IEEE 1754 term hexlet indicating 16 octets.

Although the word hextet is not officially recognized in the IETF documents, it is used in technical literature on IPv6 published after the Internet Draft. Official IETF documents simply refer to them as pieces.

Cisco sources generally use the term quartet as does IPv6.com, a reference either to the four-digit grouping or to the fact that it represents four nibbles; however, this term is also used by some to refer to a four-bit aggregation.

== See also ==
- Sextet (group of 6 bits)
- Doublet (2 octets)
