= Packet aggregation =

Combining data packets to reduce overhead

In a packet-based communications network, packet aggregation is the process of joining multiple packets together into a single transmission unit, in order to reduce the overhead associated with each transmission.

Packet aggregation is useful in situations where each transmission unit may have significant overhead (preambles, headers, cyclic redundancy check, etc.) or where the expected packet size is small compared to the maximum amount of information that can be transmitted.

In a communication system based on a layered OSI model, packet aggregation may be responsible for joining multiple MSDUs into a single MPDU that can be delivered to the physical layer as a single unit for transmission.

The ITU-T G.hn standard, which provides a way to create a high-speed (up to 1 Gigabit/s) Local area network using existing home wiring (power lines, phone lines and coaxial cables), is an example of a protocol that employs packet aggregation to increase efficiency.

== See also ==
- Packet segmentation
- Frame aggregation
