= Frame (networking) =

Data transmission unit

A frame is a digital data transmission unit in computer networking and telecommunications. In packet switched systems, a frame is a simple container for a single network packet. In other telecommunications systems, a frame is a repeating structure supporting time-division multiplexing.

A frame typically includes frame synchronization features consisting of a sequence of bits or symbols that indicate to the receiver the beginning and end of the payload data within the stream of symbols or bits it receives. If a receiver is connected to the system during frame transmission, it ignores the data until it detects a new frame synchronization sequence.

== Packet switching ==
In the OSI model of computer networking, a frame is the protocol data unit at the data link layer. Frames are the result of the final layer of encapsulation before the data is transmitted over the physical layer. A frame is "the unit of transmission in a link layer protocol, and consists of a link layer header followed by a packet." Each frame is separated from the next by an interframe gap. A frame is a series of bits generally composed of frame synchronization bits, the packet payload, and a frame check sequence. Examples are Ethernet frames, Wi-Fi frames, 4G frames, Point-to-Point Protocol (PPP) frames, Fibre Channel frames, and V.42 modem frames.

Often, frames of several different sizes are nested inside each other. For example, when using Point-to-Point Protocol (PPP) over asynchronous serial communication, the eight bits of each individual byte are framed by start and stop bits, the payload data bytes in a network packet are framed by the header and footer, and several packets can be framed with frame boundary octets.

== Time-division multiplex ==
In telecommunications, specifically in time-division multiplex (TDM) and time-division multiple access (TDMA) variants, a frame is a cyclically repeated data block that consists of a fixed number of time slots, one for each logical TDM channel or TDMA transmitter. In this context, a frame is typically an entity at the physical layer. TDM application examples are SONET/SDH and the ISDN circuit-switched B-channel, while TDMA examples are Circuit Switched Data used in early cellular voice services. The frame is also an entity for time-division duplex, where the mobile terminal may transmit during some time slots and receive during others.

== See also ==
- Application-layer framing
- Datagram
- Jumbo frame
- Multiplex techniques
- Overhead bit
