= Header (computing) =

Information at the beginning of data which describes or defines the data

In information technology, header is supplemental data placed at the beginning of a block of data being stored or transmitted. In data transmission, the data following the header is sometimes called the payload or body.

It is vital that header composition follows a clear and unambiguous specification or format, to allow for parsing.

== Examples ==
- E-mail header: The text (body) is preceded by header lines indicating sender, recipient, subject, sending time stamp, receiving time stamps of all intermediate and the final mail transfer agents, and much more.
- Similar headers are used in Usenet (NNTP) messages, and HTTP headers.
- In a data packet sent via the Internet, the data (payload) are preceded by header information such as the sender's and the recipient's IP addresses, the protocol governing the format of the payload and several other formats. The header's format is specified in the Internet Protocol, see IP header.
- In data packets sent by wireless communication, and in sectors of data stored on magnetic media, typically the header begins with a syncword to allow the receiver to adapt to analog amplitude and speed variations and for frame synchronization.
- In graphics file formats, the header might give information about an image's size, resolution, number of colors, and the like.
- In archive file formats, the file header might serve as a fingerprint or signature to identify the specific file format and corresponding software utility.
- In some programming languages (for example C and C++) the functions are declared in header files.

== See also ==
- Footer
- Protocol overhead
- Trailer (computing), used in computer networking
- Field (computer science)
