= Octet (computing) =

Unit of digital information

octet
- Unit system: units derived from bit
- Unit of: digital information, data size
- Symbol: o
- In primary units of information: 1 o = 8 bits

The octet is a unit of digital information in computing and telecommunications that consists of eight bits. The term is often used when the term byte might be ambiguous, as the term byte has historically been used for storage units of a variety of sizes.

The term octad(e) for eight bits is no longer common.

== Definition ==
The international standard IEC 60027-2, chapter 3.8.2, states that a byte is an octet of bits. However, the unit byte has historically been platform-dependent and has represented various storage sizes in the history of computing. Due to the influence of several major computer architectures and product lines, the byte became overwhelmingly associated with eight bits. This meaning of byte is codified in such standards as ISO/IEC 80000-13. While byte and octet are often used synonymously, those working with certain legacy systems are careful to avoid ambiguity.

Octets can be represented using number systems of varying bases such as the hexadecimal, decimal, or octal number systems. The binary value of all eight bits set (or activated) is 111111112, equal to the hexadecimal value FF16, the decimal value 25510, and the octal value 3778. One octet can be used to represent decimal values ranging from 0 to 255.

The term octet (symbol: o (Note: However, the IEC 80000-13 symbol "o" for octets can be confused with the postfix "o" to indicate octal numbers in Intel convention.)) is often used when the use of byte might be ambiguous. It is frequently used in the Request for Comments (RFC) publications of the Internet Engineering Task Force to describe storage sizes of network protocol parameters. The earliest example is RFC 635 from 1974. In 2000, Bob Bemer claimed to have earlier proposed the usage of the term octet for "8-bit bytes" when he headed software operations for Cie. Bull in France in 1965 to 1966.

In France, French Canada and formerly in Romania, octet is used in common language instead of byte when the eight-bit sense is required; for example, a megabyte (MB) is termed a megaoctet (Mo).

A variable-length sequence of octets, as in Abstract Syntax Notation One (ASN.1), is referred to as an octet string.

=== Octad ===
Historically, in Western Europe, the term octad (or octade) was used to specifically denote eight bits, a usage no longer common. Early examples of usage exist in British, Dutch and German sources of the 1960s and 1970s, and throughout the documentation of Philips mainframe computers. Similar terms are triad for a grouping of three bits and decade for ten bits.

== Unit multiples ==
Unit multiples of the octet may be formed with SI prefixes and binary prefixes (power of 2 prefixes) as standardized by the International Electrotechnical Commission in 1998.

SI prefixes
1 kilooctet (ko)	= 10^{3} octets		= 1000 octets
1 megaoctet (Mo)	= 10^{6} octets	= 1000 ko	= 1000000 octets
1 gigaoctet (Go)	= 10^{9} octets	= 1000 Mo	= 1000000000 octets
1 teraoctet (To)	= 10^{12} octets	= 1000 Go	= 1000000000000 octets
1 petaoctet (Po)	= 10^{15} octets	= 1000 To	= 1000000000000000 octets
1 exaoctet (Eo)	= 10^{18} octets	= 1000 Po	= 1000000000000000000 octets
1 zettaoctet (Zo)	= 10^{21} octets	= 1000 Eo	= 1000000000000000000000 octets
1 yottaoctet (Yo)	= 10^{24} octets	= 1000 Zo	= 1000000000000000000000000 octets

Binary prefixes
1 kibioctet (Kio, also written Ko, as distinct from ko)	= 2^{10} octets		= 1024 octets
1 mebioctet (Mio)	= 2^{20} octets	= 1024 Kio	= 1048576 octets
1 gibioctet (Gio)	= 2^{30} octets	= 1024 Mio	= 1073741824 octets
1 tebioctet (Tio)	= 2^{40} octets	= 1024 Gio	= 1099511627776 octets
1 pebioctet (Pio)	= 2^{50} octets	= 1024 Tio	= 1125899906842624 octets
1 exbioctet (Eio)	= 2^{60} octets	= 1024 Pio	= 1152921504606846976 octets
1 zebioctet (Zio)	= 2^{70} octets	= 1024 Eio	= 1180591620717411303424 octets
1 yobioctet (Yio)	= 2^{80} octets	= 1024 Zio	= 1208925819614629174706176 octets

== Use in Internet Protocol addresses ==
The octet is used in representations of Internet Protocol computer network addresses. An IPv4 address consists of four octets, usually displayed individually as a series of decimal values ranging from 0 to 255, each separated by a dot (a full stop/period). Using octets with all eight bits set, the representation of the highest-numbered IPv4 address is 255.255.255.255.

An IPv6 address consists of sixteen octets, displayed in hexadecimal representation (two hexits per octet), using a colon character (:) after each pair of octets (16 bits are also known as hextet) for readability, such as 2001:0db8:0000:0000:0123:4567:89ab:cdef.

== See also ==
- Variable-width encoding
