= Link layer =

Lowest abstraction layer in the Internet protocol suite

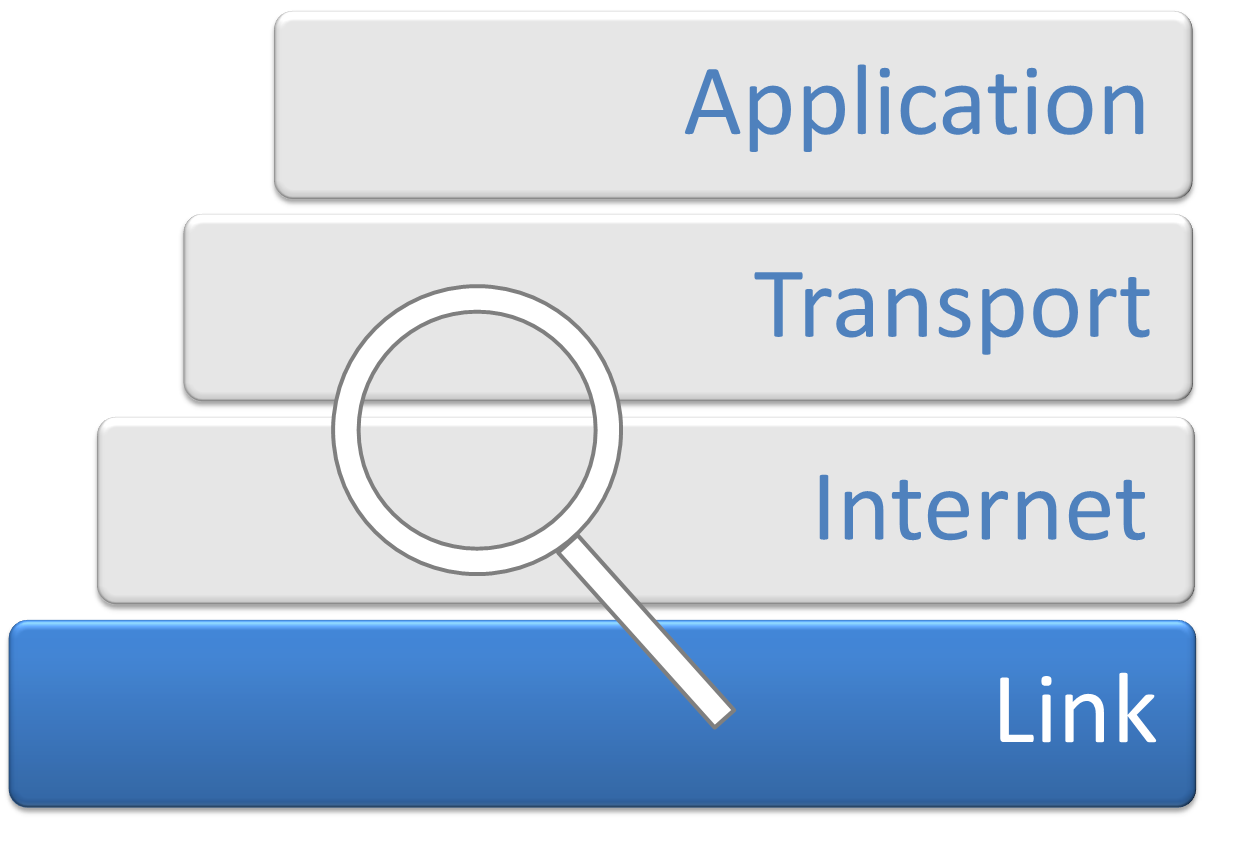
Internet protocol suite layers with Link layer highlighted

In computer networking, the link layer is the lowest layer in the Internet protocol suite, the networking architecture of the Internet. The link layer is the group of methods and communications protocols confined to the link that a host is physically connected to. The link is the physical and logical network component used to interconnect hosts or nodes in the network, and a link protocol is a suite of methods and standards that operate only between adjacent network nodes of a network segment.

Despite the different semantics of layering between the Internet protocol suite and OSI model, the link layer is sometimes described as a combination of the OSI's data link layer (layer 2) and physical layer (layer 1).

The link layer is described in RFC 1122 and RFC 1123. RFC 1122 considers local area network protocols such as Ethernet and other IEEE 802 networks (e.g. Wi-Fi), and framing protocols such as Point-to-Point Protocol (PPP) to belong to the link layer.

== Definition in standards and textbooks ==
Local area networking standards such as Ethernet and IEEE 802.3 specifications use terminology from the seven-layer OSI model rather than the TCP/IP model. The TCP/IP model, in general, does not consider physical specifications; rather, it assumes a working network infrastructure that can deliver media-level frames on the link. Therefore, RFC 1122 and RFC 1123, the definition of the TCP/IP model, do not discuss hardware issues and physical data transmission and set no standards for those aspects. Some textbook authors have supported the interpretation that physical data transmission aspects are part of the link layer. Others assumed that physical data transmission standards are not considered communication protocols, and are not part of the TCP/IP model. These authors assume a hardware layer or physical layer below the link layer, and several of them adopt the OSI term data link layer instead of link layer in a modified description of layering. In the predecessor to the TCP/IP model, the ARPAnet Reference Model (RFC 908, 1982), aspects of the link layer are referred to by several poorly defined terms, such as network-access layer, network-access protocol, as well as network layer, while the next higher layer is called internetwork layer. In some modern textbooks, network-interface layer, host-to-network layer and network-access layer occur as synonyms either to the link layer or the data link layer, often including the physical layer.

== Link layer protocols ==
In the TCP/IP model, the link layer is the set of protocols a host uses to communicate on its directly connected network. The particular link-layer or media-access protocol depends on the network technology in use. Link-layer frames are delivered on the local link rather than routed unchanged across networks; routing between networks is performed at the Internet layer by gateways or IP routers.

Protocols and facilities associated with link-layer address resolution include the Address Resolution Protocol (ARP), which maps protocol addresses such as IP addresses to local network addresses such as Ethernet addresses; the Reverse Address Resolution Protocol (RARP), which was specified as a data-link-level protocol for obtaining a protocol address from a hardware address; and Neighbor Discovery for IPv6, which IPv6 nodes on the same link use to determine link-layer addresses and which corresponds in part to IPv4 ARP.

== Relation to OSI model ==
The link layer in the TCP/IP model does not correspond exactly to a single layer in the Open Systems Interconnection (OSI) model. RFC 1122 describes the Internet protocol suite as having application, transport, Internet, and link layers, and describes the lowest layer as the "link layer" or "media-access layer" protocol used by a host to communicate on its directly connected network. The OSI Basic Reference Model instead separates lower-layer functions into the physical layer and the data link layer. As a result, comparisons between the TCP/IP link layer and OSI layers 1 and 2 are approximate rather than exact.

The difference in classification can be seen in protocols such as the Address Resolution Protocol (ARP). ARP was specified to translate protocol addresses, such as IP addresses, into local network addresses, such as Ethernet addresses. RFC 1122 treats ARP use on Ethernet and IEEE 802 networks as a link-layer requirement. In OSI terminology, however, ARP relates to both network-layer addressing and data-link-layer addressing, so its placement is not captured cleanly by a strict one-to-one mapping between the two models. RFC 3439 similarly cautions against treating protocol layers as strict implementation boundaries, noting that structured layering has conceptual advantages but may also impose ordering constraints and increase inter-layer complexity.

== IETF standards ==
- R. Coltun; D. Ferguson; J. Moy (July 2008). A. Lindem (ed.). OSPF for IPv6. IETF Network Working Group. doi:10.17487/RFC5340. RFC 5340. Proposed Standard. Obsoletes RFC 2740. Updated by RFC 6845, 6860, 8362, 7503 and 9454
- R. Braden, ed. (October 1989). Requirements for Internet Hosts -- Communication Layers. Network Working Group. doi:10.17487/RFC1122. STD 3. RFC 1122. Internet Standard 3. Updated by RFC 1349, 4379, 5884, 6093, 6298, 6633, 6864, 8029 and 9293.
- R. Braden, ed. (October 1989). Requirements for Internet Hosts -- Application and Support. Network Working Group. doi:10.17487/RFC1123. STD 3. RFC 1123. Internet Standard 3. Updated by RFC 1349, 2181, 5321, 5966 and 7766.
- J. Postel; J. Reynolds (February 1988). A Standard for the Transmission of IP Datagrams over IEEE 802 Networks. Network Working Group. doi:10.17487/RFC1042. STD 43. RFC 1042. Internet Standard 43. Obsoletes RFC 948.
- C. Hornig (April 1984). A Standard for the Transmission of IP Datagrams over Ethernet Networks. Network Working Group. doi:10.17487/RFC0894. STD 41. RFC 894. Internet Standard 41.
- S. J. Leffler; M. J. Karels (April 1984). Trailer Encapsulations. Network Working Group. doi:10.17487/RFC0893. RFC 893. Status Unknown.
- David C. Plummer (November 1982). An Ethernet Address Resolution Protocol. Network Working Group. doi:10.17487/RFC0826. STD 37. RFC 826. Internet Standard 37. Updated by RFC 5227 and 5494.

== See also ==
- Carrier-sense multiple access
- Carrier-sense multiple access with collision detection
- Network interface layer security
