= Dukkipati =

Dukkipati (Telugu: దుక్కిపాటి) is a Telugu surname. Notable people with the surname include:

- Dukkipati Nageswara Rao, Indian activist
- Dukkipati Madhusudhana Rao, Indian film producer (1917–2006)
- Nandita Dukkipati, Indian-American electrical engineer
