= Craig Partridge =

American computer scientist

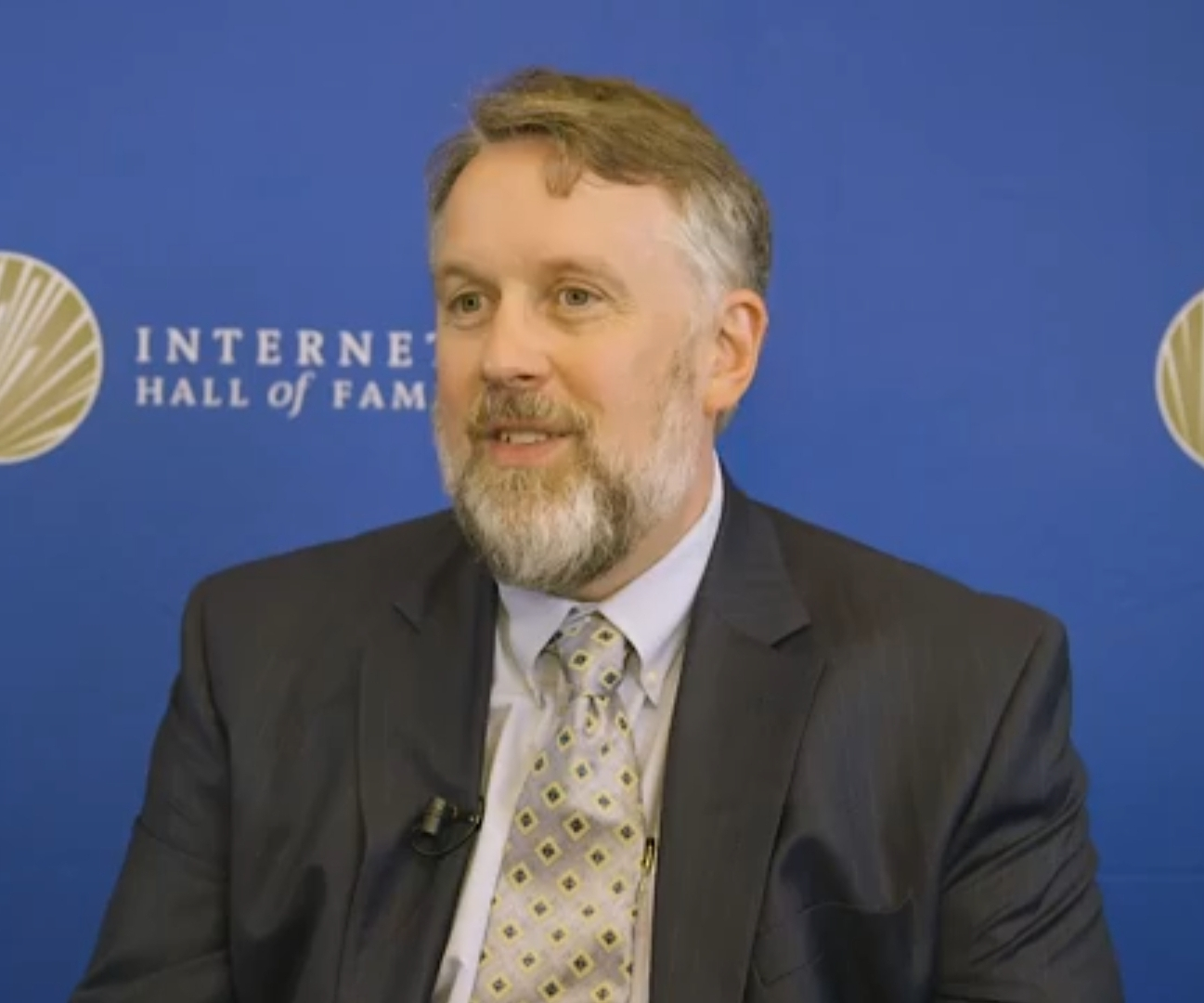
- Born: July 17, 1961 (age 64)

Craig Partridge (born July 17, 1961) is an American computer scientist, known for his contributions to the technical development of the Internet.

Partridge graduated in 1979 from Woodrow Wilson High School in Washington D.C. He received his A.B. in history in 1983, and in 1992 received his Ph.D. in computer science, from Harvard University.

Starting in 1983, Partridge was a researcher at BBN Technologies, where he eventually became Chief Scientist for networking research. During the 1980s, Dr. Partridge designed the method of email routing using domain names, and, in collaboration with Phil Karn, made contributions to the Transmission Control Protocol (TCP) round-trip time estimation by inventing Karn's algorithm. In the 1990s he co-invented anycast addressing, led the team that developed the first multi-gigabit router.

Partridge served on the first Internet Engineering Steering Group, has chaired the Association for Computing Machinery's Special Interest Group on Data Communications (SIGCOMM), been editor-in-chief of both the Institute of Electrical and Electronics Engineers (IEEE) Network Magazine and SIGCOMM's Computer Communication Review, and served on the National Science Foundation's Computer, Information Science and Engineering (CISE) Advisory Committee, and on the National Research Council's Computer Science and Telecommunications Board. He has held adjunct faculty positions at Stanford University and the University of Michigan, and chaired the Department of Computer Science in Colorado State University until 2023.

Partridge is an ACM Fellow and IEEE Fellow for contributions to the development of Internet protocols that support larger and faster networks. In 2017, Partridge was inducted into the Internet Hall of Fame.

== Selected works ==
- "Mail routing and the domain system", RFC 974, Craig Partridge, 1986.
- "Improving round-trip time estimates in reliable transport protocols", Phil Karn, Craig Partridge ACM SIGCOMM Computer Communication Review, 1987.
- "Host Anycasting Service", RFC 1546, Craig Partridge, Trevor Mendez, Walter Milliken, 1993.
- Gigabit Networking, Craig Partridge, Addison-Wesley, 1993. ISBN 978-0201563337
