= Protocol ossification =

Reduction in the flexibility of network protocol design due to middleboxes

Protocol ossification is the loss of flexibility, extensibility and evolvability of network protocols. This is largely due to middleboxes that are sensitive to the wire image of the protocol, and which can interrupt or interfere with messages that are valid but which the middlebox does not correctly recognise. This is a violation of the end-to-end principle. Secondary causes include inflexibility in endpoint implementations of protocols.

Ossification is a major issue in Internet protocol design and deployment, as it can prevent new protocols or extensions from being deployed on the Internet, or place strictures on the design of new protocols; new protocols may have to be encapsulated in an already-deployed protocol or mimic the wire image of another protocol. Because of ossification, the Transmission Control Protocol (TCP) and User Datagram Protocol (UDP) are the only practical choices for transport protocols on the Internet, and TCP itself has significantly ossified, making extension or modification of the protocol difficult.

Recommended methods of preventing ossification include encrypting protocol metadata, and ensuring that extension points are exercised and wire image variability is exhibited as fully as possible; remedying existing ossification requires coordination across protocol participants. QUIC is the first IETF transport protocol to have been designed with deliberate anti-ossification properties.

== History ==
Significant ossification had set in on the Internet by 2005, with analyses of the problem also being published in that year; Ammar (2018) suggests that ossification was a consequence of the Internet attaining global scale and becoming the primary communication network.

Multipath TCP was the first extension to a core Internet protocol to deeply confront protocol ossification during its design.

The IETF created the Transport Services (taps) working group in 2014. It has a mandate to mitigate ossification at the transport protocol layer.

QUIC is the first IETF transport protocol to deliberately minimise its wire image to avoid ossification.

The Internet Architecture Board identified design considerations around the exposure of protocol information to network elements as a "developing field" in 2023.

== Causes ==
The primary cause of protocol ossification is middlebox interference, invalidating the end-to-end principle. Middleboxes may entirely block unknown protocols or unrecognised extensions to known protocols, interfere with extension or feature negotiation, or perform more invasive modification of protocol metadata. Not all middlebox modifications are necessarily ossifying; of those which are potentially harmful, they are disproportionately towards the network edge. Middleboxes are deployed by network operators unilaterally to solve specific problems, including performance optimisation, security requirements (e.g., firewalls), network address translation or enhancing control of networks. These middlebox deployments provide localised short-term utility but degrade the global long-term evolvability of the Internet in a manifestation of the tragedy of the commons.

Changes to a protocol must be tolerated by all on-path intermediaries; if wide Internet deployment of the change is desired, then this extends to a large portion of intermediaries on the Internet. A middlebox must tolerate widely used protocols as they were being used at the time of its deployment, but is liable not to tolerate new protocols or changes to extant ones, effectively creating a vicious cycle as novel wire images cannot gain wide enough deployment to make middleboxes tolerate the new wire image across the entire Internet. Even all participants tolerating the protocol is no guarantee of use: in the absence of a negotiation or discovery mechanism, the endpoints may default to a protocol that is considered more reliable.

Beyond middleboxes, ossification can also be caused by insufficient flexibility within the endpoint's implementation. Operating system kernels are slow to change and deploy, and protocols implemented in hardware can also inappropriately fix protocol details. A widely used application programming interface (API) that makes assumptions about the operation of underlying protocols can hinder the deployment of protocols that do not share those assumptions.

== Prevention and remediation ==
The Internet Architecture Board recommended in 2019 that implicit signals to observers should be replaced with signals deliberately intended for the consumption of those observers, and signals not intended for their consumption should not be available to them (e.g., by encryption); and also that the protocol metadata should be integrity protected so that it cannot be modified by middleboxes. However, even fully encrypted metadata may not entirely prevent ossification in the network, as the wire image of a protocol can still show patterns that come to be relied upon. Network operators use metadata for a variety of benign management purposes, and Internet research is also informed by data gathered from protocol metadata; a protocol's designer must balance ossification resistance against observability for operational or research needs. Arkko et al. (2023) provides further guidance on these considerations: disclosure of information by a protocol to the network should be intentional, performed with the agreement of both recipient and sender, authenticated to the degree possible and necessary, only acted upon to the degree of its trustworthiness, and minimised and provided to a minimum number of entities.

Active use of extension points is required if they are not to ossify. Reducing the number of extension points, documenting invariants that protocol participants can rely on as opposed to incidental details that must not be relied upon, and prompt detection of issues in deployed systems can assist in ensuring active use. However, even active use may only exercise a narrow portion of the protocol and ossification can still occur in the parts that remain invariant in practice despite theoretical variability. "Greasing" an extension point, where some implementations indicate support for non-existent extensions, can ensure that actually-existent-but-unrecognised extensions are tolerated (cf. chaos engineering). HTTP headers are an example of an extension point that has successfully avoided significant ossification, as participants will generally ignore unrecognised headers.

A new protocol may be designed to mimic the wire image of an existing ossified protocol; alternatively, a new protocol may be encapsulated within an existing, tolerated protocol. A disadvantage of encapsulation is that there is typically overhead and redundant work (e.g., outer checksums made redundant by inner integrity checks).

Besides middleboxes, other sources of ossification can also be resisted. User-space implementation of protocols can lead to more rapid evolution. If the new protocol is encapsulated in UDP, then user-space implementation is possible. Where support for protocols is uncertain, participants may simultaneously try alternative protocols, at the cost of increasing the amount of data sent.

With sufficient effort and coordination, ossification can be directly reversed. A flag day, where protocol participants make changes in concert, can break the vicious cycle and establish active use. This approach was used to deploy EDNS, which had formerly not been tolerated by servers.

== Examples ==
The Transmission Control Protocol has suffered from ossification. One measurement found that a third of paths across the Internet encounter at least one intermediary that modifies TCP metadata, and 6.5% of paths encounter harmful ossifying effects from intermediaries. Extensions to TCP have been affected: the design of MPTCP was constrained by middlebox behaviour, and the deployment of TCP Fast Open has been likewise hindered.

The Stream Control Transmission Protocol has been little-deployed on the Internet due to intolerance from middleboxes, and also due to the very widespread BSD sockets API ill-fitting its capabilities. In practice, TCP and UDP are the only usable Internet transport protocols.

Transport Layer Security (TLS) has experienced ossification. TLS was the original context for the introduction of greasing extension points. TLS 1.3, as originally designed, proved undeployable on the Internet: middleboxes had ossified the protocol's version parameter. This was discovered late in the protocol design process, during experimental deployments by web browsers. As a result, version 1.3 mimics the wire image of version 1.2.

QUIC has been specifically designed to be deployable, evolvable and to have anti-ossification properties; it is the first IETF transport protocol to deliberately minimise its wire image for these ends. It is greased, it has protocol invariants explicitly specified, it is encapsulated in UDP, and its protocol metadata is encrypted. Still, applications using QUIC must be prepared to fall back to other protocols, as UDP is blocked by some middleboxes.

== See also ==
- Backward compatibility
- Collective action problem
- De facto standard
- Forward compatibility
- Interoperability
- Hyrum's law
- Network effect
- Robustness principle
- Vendor lock-in

== Bibliography ==
- Trammell, Brian; Kuehlewind, Mirja (April 2019). The Wire Image of a Network Protocol. IETF. doi:10.17487/RFC8546. RFC 8546.
- Hardie, Ted, ed. (April 2019). Transport Protocol Path Signals. IETF. doi:10.17487/RFC8558. RFC 8558.
- Thomson, Martin (May 2021). Version-Independent Properties of QUIC. IETF. doi:10.17487/RFC8999. RFC 8999.
- Fairhurst, Gorry; Perkins, Colin (July 2021). Considerations around Transport Header Confidentiality, Network Operations, and the Evolution of Internet Transport Protocols. IETF. doi:10.17487/RFC9065. RFC 9065.
- Thomson, Martin; Pauly, Tommy (December 2021). Long-Term Viability of Protocol Extension Mechanisms. IETF. doi:10.17487/RFC9170. RFC 9170.
- Kühlewind, Mirja; Trammell, Brian (September 2022). Applicability of the QUIC Transport Protocol. IETF. doi:10.17487/RFC9308. RFC 9308.
- Arkko, Jari; Hardie, Ted; Pauly, Tommy; Kühlewind, Mirja (July 2023). Considerations on Application - Network Collaboration Using Path Signals. IETF. doi:10.17487/RFC9419. RFC 9419.
- Honda, Michio; Nishida, Yoshifumi; Raiciu, Costin; Greenhalgh, Adam; Handley, Mark; Tokuda, Hideyuki (2011). Is It Still Possible to Extend TCP?. 2011 ACM SIGCOMM Conference on Internet Measurement. doi:10.1145/2068816.2068834.
- Raiciu, Costin; Paasch, Christoph; Barre, Sebastien; Ford, Alan; Honda, Michio; Duchene, Fabien; Bonaventure, Olivier; Handley, Mark (2012). How Hard Can It Be? Designing and Implementing a Deployable Multipath TCP. 9th USENIX Symposium on Networked Systems Design and Implementation (NSDI 12).
- Hesmans, Benjamin; Duchene, Fabien; Paasch, Christoph; Detal, Gregory; Bonaventure, Olivier (2013). Are TCP extensions middlebox-proof?. HotMiddlebox '13. CiteSeerX 10.1.1.679.6364. doi:10.1145/2535828.2535830.
- Corbet, Jonathan (8 December 2015). "Checksum offloads and protocol ossification". LWN.net.
- Corbet, Jonathan (20 June 2016). "Transport-level protocols in user space". LWN.net.
- McQuistin, Stephen; Perkins, Colin; Fayed, Marwan (July 2016). Implementing Real-Time Transport Services over an Ossified Network. 2016 Applied Networking Research Workshop. doi:10.1145/2959424.2959443. hdl:1893/26111.
- Papastergiou, Giorgos; Fairhurst, Gorry; Ros, David; Brunstrom, Anna; Grinnemo, Karl-Johan; Hurtig, Per; Khademi, Naeem; Tüxen, Michael; Welzl, Michael; Damjanovic, Dragana; Mangiante, Simone (2017). "De-Ossifying the Internet Transport Layer: A Survey and Future Perspectives". IEEE Communications Surveys & Tutorials. 19: 619–639. doi:10.1109/COMST.2016.2626780. hdl:2164/8317. S2CID 1846371.
- Sullivan, Nick (2017-12-26). "Why TLS 1.3 isn't in browsers yet". The Cloudflare Blog.
- Ammar, Mostafa (January 2018). "Ex Uno Pluria: The Service-Infrastructure Cycle, Ossification, and the Fragmentation of the Internet". ACM SIGCOMM Comput. Commun. Rev. arXiv:1712.04379. doi:10.1145/3211852.3211861. S2CID 12169344.
- Corbet, Jonathan (29 January 2018). "QUIC as a solution to protocol ossification". LWN.net.
- Edeline, Korian; Donnet, Benoit (2019). A Bottom-Up Investigation of the Transport-Layer Ossification. 2019 Network Traffic Measurement and Analysis Conference (TMA). doi:10.23919/TMA.2019.8784690.
- Rybczyńska, Marta (13 March 2020). "A QUIC look at HTTP/3". LWN.net.
