= TTCP =

TTCP may refer to:

- ttcp, a computer utility program for measuring network throughput
- T/TCP, a variant of the TCP protocol
- The Technical Cooperation Program, an international organisation concerned with cooperation on defence science and technology matters
- The ICAO code for Arthur Napoleon Raymond Robinson International Airport (formerly Crown Point Airport) on the island of Tobago (TTCP - Trinidad & Tobago Crown Point)
- Tetracalciumphosphate Ca_{4}(PO_{4})_{2}
