= TCP fusion =

Proposed TCP congestion control algorithm

TCP Fusion is a proposed congestion control algorithm for the Transmission Control Protocol (TCP) designed to improve quality of service over high-speed and long-distance networks. Primarily studied in research contexts and has contributed to ongoing efforts to design more adaptive and efficient congestion control methods, it combines elements from several earlier TCP variants to better adapt to varying network conditions, achieving higher throughput, and improved fairness among flows.

Traditional TCP algorithms, such as TCP Reno, rely primarily on packet loss as a signal of network congestion, which can limit performance in high-bandwidth or high-latency environments. TCP Fusion instead integrates both loss-based and delay-based approaches, drawing on ideas from algorithms like TCP Vegas and TCP Westwood. By monitoring network delay as well as packet loss, it aims to detect congestion earlier and adjust transmission rates more smoothly.

TCP-Fusion’s tuning for low-latency, high-bandwidth terrestrial links limits its effectiveness over satellite Internet.
