= PUSH and ACK floods =

Denial of service attacks

PUSH floods and ACK floods are denial of service attacks based on the PSH and ACK flags.

Since these flags require additional processing it may be possible to overwhelm a service by setting these flags on numerous requests.

== Mitigation ==
Proxy filters may drop appropriate packets with these flags set when the system is considered to be under attack.

== See also ==
- SYN flood
