= Out-of-order delivery =

Delivery of data packets in a different order from which they were sent

In computer networking, out-of-order delivery is the delivery of data packets in a different order from which they were sent. Out-of-order delivery can be caused by packets following multiple paths through a network, by lower-layer retransmission procedures (such as automatic repeat request), or via parallel processing paths within network equipment that are not designed to ensure that packet ordering is preserved. One of the functions of TCP is to prevent the out-of-order delivery of data, either by reassembling packets in order or requesting retransmission of out-of-order packets.

== See also ==
- Packet loss
- Selective ACK
- IP fragmentation
- Head-of-line blocking
