= Flag day (computing) =

Coordinated cutover for incompatible changes in software or protocols

A flag day (or flag day cutover) in computing and system administration is a planned change that requires many systems to be upgraded or converted in a coordinated way because the old and new versions are not mutually compatible. Such changes are typically costly to carry out and, if problems arise, difficult to roll back.

Flag days can occur when constraints on backward compatibility or forward compatibility prevent a gradual migration, requiring updates to be performed nearly simultaneously for the overall system to function. In contrast, phased deployments aim to preserve service continuity by allowing old and new versions to coexist during the transition.

== Origin ==
The term is commonly traced to the Multics project: a system-wide change to the system's handling of the ASCII character set was scheduled for the U.S. holiday Flag Day (14 June 1966), and the name was applied by analogy to other coordinated, incompatible changeovers. This etymology appears in the Jargon File as early as 1981.

== Examples ==
- On 1 January 1983, the ARPANET conducted a coordinated transition from NCP to the TCP/IP protocol suite, a milestone sometimes described as a network “flag day.” The irreversible transition took place on a fixed date; that is, it was conducted in "flag day" style.
- "DNS Flag Day 2019" was a coordinated change beginning on 1 February 2019, in which DNS software and service providers removed certain workarounds related to EDNS handling, potentially affecting name resolution for domains hosted on non-compliant authoritative servers. Several "DNS Flag Days," coordinating the retirement of other obsolescent features, have been held since 2019.

== See also ==
- Backward compatibility
- Forward compatibility
- Protocol ossification
