= KA9Q =

KA9Q, also called KA9Q NOS or simply NOS, was a popular early implementation of TCP/IP and associated protocols for amateur packet radio systems and smaller personal computers connected via serial lines. It was named after the amateur radio callsign of Phil Karn, who first wrote the software for a CP/M system and then ported it to DOS on the IBM PC. As the KA9Q package included source code, many radio amateurs modified it, so many different versions were available at the same time.

KA9Q was later maintained by Anthony Frost (callsign G8UDV) and Adam Goodfellow. It was ported to the Acorn Archimedes by Jonathan Naylor (G4KLX). It was ported to the Amiga by John Heaton as AmigaNOS. Until 1995, it was the standard access software provided by British dial-up internet service provider Demon Internet.

Most modern operating systems provide a built-in implementation of TCP/IP protocol; Linux especially includes all the necessary kernel functions and support utilities for TCP/IP over amateur radio systems, as well as basic AX.25 and NET/ROM functionality. Therefore, NOS is regarded as obsolete by its original developer. It still may have its uses for embedded systems that are too small for Linux.

KA9Q is also a name for the IP-over-IP Tunneling protocol.
