= Karn's algorithm =

Karn's algorithm addresses the problem of getting accurate estimates of the round-trip time for messages when using the Transmission Control Protocol (TCP) in computer networking. The algorithm, also sometimes termed as the Karn-Partridge algorithm was proposed in a paper by Phil Karn and Craig Partridge in 1987.

Accurate round trip estimates in TCP can be difficult to calculate because of an ambiguity created by retransmitted segments. The round trip time is estimated as the difference between the time that a segment was sent and the time that its acknowledgment was returned to the sender, but when packets are re-transmitted there is an ambiguity: the acknowledgment may be a response to the first transmission of the segment or to a subsequent re-transmission.

Karn's Algorithm ignores retransmitted segments when updating the round-trip time estimate. Round trip time estimation is based only on unambiguous acknowledgments, which are acknowledgments for segments that were sent only once.

This simplistic implementation of Karn's algorithm can lead to problems as well. Consider what happens when TCP sends a segment after a sharp increase in delay. Using the prior round-trip time estimate, TCP computes a timeout and retransmits a segment. If TCP ignores the round-trip time of all retransmitted packets, the round trip estimate will never be updated, and TCP will continue retransmitting every segment, never adjusting to the increased delay.

A solution to this problem is to incorporate transmission timeouts with a timer backoff strategy. The timer backoff strategy computes an initial timeout. If the timer expires and causes a retransmission, TCP increases the timeout generally by a factor of two. This algorithm has proven to be extremely effective in balancing performance and efficiency in networks with high packet loss. Ideally, Karn's algorithm would not be needed. Networks that have high round-trip time and retransmission timeouts should be investigated using root cause analysis techniques.
