= Sockstress =

Attack method

Sockstress is a method of attacking servers and other devices that accept TCP connections on the Internet and other TCP-based networks. This method depletes local resources in order to crash a service or an entire machine, essentially functioning as a denial-of-service attack.

Sockstress was developed as an internal proof-of-concept by the late Jack C. Louis at Outpost24. Louis discovered anomalies using Unicornscan to test and probe networks for corporate security, which led to the development of Sockstress. The concept was first demonstrated in September 2008. The researchers had planned on releasing more details at the T2 conference in Finland where they demonstrated the attacks. They instead chose to continue to work closely with, and give more time to, the vendor and standards communities. In a blog entry, they said "We are not putting them [the vendors] under undue pressure to get poorly implemented rushed fixes out."

A proof-of-concept tool, Nkiller2, that demonstrated an attack similar to sockstress was released by Fotis Chantzis aka ithilgore on Phrack ezine. Nkiller2 works completely statelessly, using packet-parsing techniques and virtual states, and exploits an inherent mechanism of TCP, the Persist Timer, thus being able to perform and infinitely prolong a generic DoS attack with a minimal amount of network traffic.

== About Sockstress ==
Sockstress is a user-land TCP socket stress framework that can complete arbitrary numbers of open sockets without incurring the typical overhead of tracking state. Once the socket is established, it is capable of sending TCP attacks targeting specific types of kernel and system resources such as Counters, Timers, and Memory Pools. Some of the attacks described here are considered "well-known"; however, the full effects of these attacks are less known. Furthermore, there are more attacks yet to be discovered or documented. As researchers document ways of depleting specific resources, attack modules could be added to the tree of the sockstress framework.

The sockstress attack tool consists of two main parts:

1) Fantaip: Fantaip is a program that spoofs IP addresses for use with sockstress. It achieves this by sending ARP replies to hosts which perform a request for the spoofed IP. To use fantaip, type 'fantaip -i interface CIDR', e.g., 'fantaip -i eth0 192.168.0.128/25'. This ARP/Layer 2 function could optionally be provided by other means depending on the requirements of the local network topology. Since sockstress completes TCP sockets in user-land, it is not advisable to use sockstress with an IP address configured for use by the kernel, as the kernel would then RST the sockets. This is not strictly required, as the use of a firewall to drop incoming packets with the rst flag can be used to achieve the same goal and prevent the kernel from interfering with the attack vector.

2) Sockstress: In its most basic use, sockstress simply opens TCP sockets and sends a specified TCP stress test. It can optionally send an application-specific TCP payload (such as an HTTP request). By default, post-attack, it ignores subsequent communications on the established socket. It can optionally ACK probes for active sockets. The attacks take advantage of the exposed resources the target makes available post-handshake.

The client-side cookies, heavily discussed in blogs, news, and discussion lists, are an implementation detail of sockstress and are not strictly necessary for carrying out these attacks.

== The attack scenarios ==
Every attack in the sockstress framework has some impact on the system/service it is attacking. However, some attacks are more effective than others against a specific system/service combination.

=== Connection flood stress ===
Sockstress does not have a special attack module for performing a simple connection flood attack, but any of the attack modules can be used as such if the -c-1 (max connections unlimited) and -m-1 (max syn unlimited) options are used.

Example commands:

1. fantaip -i eth0 192.168.1.128/25 -vvv
2. sockstress -A -c-1 -d 192.168.1.100 -m-1 -Mz -p22,80 -r300 -s192.168.1.128/25 -vv

=== Zero window connection stress ===
Create a connection to a listening socket and upon 3 way handshake (inside last ACK) send 0 window.

       syn -> (4k window)
               <- syn+ack (32k window)
       ack -> (0 window)

Now the server will have to "probe" the client until the zero window opens up. This is the most simple of the attack types to understand. The result is similar to a connection flood, except that the sockets remain open potentially indefinitely (when -A/ACK is enabled). This is described in the CPNI document in section 2.2. A variation here would be to PSH a client payload (i.e. 'GET / HTTP/1.0') before setting the window to 0. This variation would be similar to what is described in the CPNI document section 5.1.1. A further variation would be to occasionally advertise a TCP window larger than 0, then go back to 0-window.

Good against:

- Services that have long timeouts

Example commands:

1. fantaip -i eth0 192.168.1.128/25 -vvv
2. sockstress -A -c-1 -d 192.168.1.100 -m-1 -Mz -p22,80 -r300 -s192.168.1.128/25 -vv

=== Small window stress ===
Create a connection to a listening socket and upon 3 way handshake (inside last ACK) set a window size of 4 bytes, then create an ACK/PSH packet with a TCP payload (into a window that is hopefully large enough to accept it) with a window still set to 4 bytes. This will potentially cause kernel memory to be consumed as it takes the response and splits it into tiny 4 byte chunks. This is unlike a connection flood in that memory is now consumed for every request made. This has reliably put Linux/Apache and Linux/sendmail systems into defunct states. It is also effective against other systems. It is expected that this has similar effects to what is described in the CPNI document in the second to last paragraph of page 17.

Look at the payload.c file in the sockstress source. Look for the hport switch statement. In that section you can specify payloads to be sent to specific ports. It is most effective to send a payload that will generate as large of a response as possible (i.e. 'GET /largefile.zip').

Good against:

- Services that contain initial connection banners
- Services that accept an initial request and send a large response (for example a GET request against a large web page, or file download)

Example commands:

1. fantaip -i eth0 192.168.1.128/25 -vvv
2. sockstress -A -c-1 -d 192.168.1.100 -m-1 -Mw -p22,80 -r300 -s192.168.1.128/25 -vv

=== Segment hole stress ===
Create a connection to a listening socket and upon 3 way handshake (inside last ACK) send 4 bytes to the beginning of a window, as advertised by the remote system. Then send 4 bytes to end of window. Then 0-window the connection. Depending on the stack, this could cause the remote system to allocate multiple pages of kernel memory per connection. This is unlike a connection flood in that memory is now consumed for every connection made. This attack was created to target Linux. It is also quite effective against Windows. This is the attack that was used in the sec-t and T2 demos. It is expected that this has similar effects to what is described in the CPNI document in section 5.2.2 5th paragraph and section 5.3.

Good against:

- Stacks that allocate multiple pages of kernel memory in response to this stimulus

Example commands:

1. fantaip -i eth0 192.168.1.128/25 -vvv
2. sockstress -A -c-1 -d 192.168.1.100 -m-1 -Ms -p22,80 -r300 -s192.168.1.128/25 -vv

=== REQ FIN pause stress ===
Create a connection to a listening socket. PSH is an application payload (i.e. 'GET / HTTP/1.0'). FIN the connection and 0-window it. This attack will have very different results depending on the stack/application you are targeting. Using this against a Cisco 1700 (IOS) web server, it was observed that sockets were left in FIN_WAIT_1 indefinitely. After enough of such sockets, the router could no longer communicate TCP correctly.

Look at the payload.c file in the sockstress source. Look for the hport switch statement. In that section, you can specify payloads to be sent to specific ports. You must send a payload that will look like a normal client to the application you are interacting with. Against a Cisco 1700, while using this attack it was important to attack at a very slow rate.

Example commands:

1. fantaip -i eth0 192.168.1.128/25 -vvv
2. sockstress -A -c-1 -d 192.168.1.100 -m-1 -MS -p80 -r10 -s192.168.1.128/25 -vv

=== Activate reno pressure stress ===
Create a connection to a listening socket. PSH is an application payload (i.e. 'GET / HTTP/1.0'). Triple duplicate ACK.

Look at the payload.c file in the sockstress source. Look for the hport switch statement. In that section, you can specify payloads to be sent to specific ports. You must send a payload that will look like a normal client to the application you are interacting with.

Good against:

- Stacks that support this method of activating reno or similar scheduler functionality

Example commands:

1. fantaip -i eth0 192.168.1.128/25 -vvv
2. sockstress -A -c-1 -d 192.168.1.100 -m-1 -MR -p22,80 -r300 -s192.168.1.128/25 -vv

=== Other Ideas ===
- FIN_WAIT_2 stress

Create a connection to a listening socket. PSH an application payload that will likely cause the application on the other side to close the socket (Target sends a FIN). ACK the FIN.

Good against:

- Stacks that don't have a FIN_WAIT_2 timeout.
- Large congestion window stress
- Shrink path MTU stress
- MD5 stress

== Effects of the attacks ==
If the attacks are successful in initiating perpetually stalled connections, the connection table of the server can quickly be filled, effectively creating a denial of service condition for a specific service. In many cases, we have also seen the attacks consume significant amounts of event queues and system memory, which intensifies the effects of the attacks. The result of this has been systems that no longer have event timers for TCP communication, frozen systems, and system reboots. The attacks do not require significant bandwidth.

While it is trivial to get a single service to become unavailable in a matter of seconds, to make an entire system become defunct can take many minutes, and in some cases hours. As a general rule, the more services a system has, the faster it will succumb to the devastating (broken TCP, system lock, reboot, etc.) effects of the attacks. Alternatively, attack amplification can be achieved by attacking from a larger number of IP addresses. We typically attack from a /29 through a /25 in our labs. Attacking from a /32 is typically less effective at causing the system wide faults.

== Exploitation caveats ==
The attack requires a successful TCP 3 way handshake to effectively fill the victim's connection tables. This limits the attack's effectiveness as an attacker cannot spoof the client's IP address to avoid traceability.

A sockstress style exploit also needs access to raw sockets on the attacking machine because the packets must be handled in userspace rather than with the OS's connect() API. Raw sockets are disabled on Windows XP SP2 and above, but device drivers are readily available to put this facility back into Windows. The exploit can be executed as-is on other platforms with raw sockets such as *nix and requires root (superuser) privileges.

== Mitigation ==
Since an attacker must be able to establish TCP sockets to affect the target, white-listing access to TCP services on critical systems and routers is the currently most effective means for mitigation. Using IPsec is also an effective mitigation.

According to the Cisco Response the current mitigation advice is to only allow trusted sources to access TCP-based services. This mitigation is particularly important for critical infrastructure devices. Red Hat has stated that "Due to upstream's decision not to release updates, Red Hat do not plan to release updates to resolve these issues; however, the effects of these attacks can be reduced." On Linux using iptables with connection tracking and rate limiting can limit the impact of exploitation significantly.
