= Nandita Dukkipati =

Indian-American electrical engineer

- Education: Birla Institute of Technology and Science, Pilani (BE); Indian Institute of Science (MS); Stanford University (PhD)
- Awards: ACM Fellow (2025)
- Scientific career
- Fields: Computer networking
- Workplaces: Google
- Thesis: Rate Control Protocol (RCP): congestion control to make flows complete quickly (2008)
- Doctoral advisor: Nick McKeown

Nandita Dukkipati is an electrical engineer and computer networking researcher. She is a Distinguished Engineer at Google. As a technical lead in Platforms Networking, her research and engineering span low-latency networking, congestion control, host networking, network interface controller (NIC) design, clock synchronization, and systems designed for telemetry and reliability. In 2025, she was named an ACM Fellow in recognition of her contributions to congestion control, transport performance, and end-host network stacks.

== Education ==
Dukkipati graduated from the Birla Institute of Technology and Science, Pilani with a Bachelor of Engineering (Honours), followed by a Master of Science from the Indian Institute of Science.

She earned a Ph.D. in Electrical Engineering from Stanford University in 2008. Her doctoral dissertation, Rate Control Protocol (RCP): Congestion Control to Make Flows Complete Quickly, was supervised by Nick McKeown.

== Research and technical work ==
Dukkipati's research concerns congestion control, transport protocols, host networking, Network interface controller, and telemetry for data-center systems. Her early research investigated the Rate Control Protocol (RCP), including resource allocation in packet networks and methods for reducing flow-completion time.

At Google, her work focuses on end-to-end network performance for applications, including low-latency networking, large-scale congestion control, and telemetry. She has co-developed hardware and software networking systems described in her co-authored research. These include Swift, a delay-based congestion-control approach; Snap, a modular, high-performance userspace networking stack based on a microkernel approach; and PicNIC, an approach to predictable virtualized network interface cards. Her other collaborative work includes Sundial, a fault-tolerant clock synchronization system, Aequitas, an admission control system that aligns application priorities with network quality of service for latency-critical remote procedure calls, and Poseidon, a congestion-control approach using programmable network hardware and in-network telemetry.

She has also been a co-author of research describing Falcon, a reliable, low-latency hardware transport system designed for workloads including machine learning, and Firefly, a scalable, high-precision clock-synchronization system for data centers.

In 2026, she co-authored CSIG: Congestion Signaling for Datacenter Transports, which describes a protocol that supplies end hosts with fine-grained information about network bottlenecks for congestion control and telemetry.

Dukkipati has co-authored Internet Engineering Task Force documents including RFC 6928, on TCP's initial congestion window; RFC 6937, on proportional rate reduction for TCP; and RFC 8985, on the RACK-TLP loss-detection algorithm for TCP.

== Professional service ==
Dukkipati was a co-chair of the 2021 ACM SIGCOMM conference and has served as chair of its Technical Steering Committee. She has also served on program committees for ACM SIGCOMM, the USENIX Symposium on Networked Systems Design and Implementation, the ACM Internet Measurement Conference, IEEE INFOCOM, and HotNets 2026.

== Awards and honors ==
- 2025 – ACM Fellow, for contributions to congestion control, transport performance, and end-host network stacks.
- 2020 – ACM SIGCOMM Best Paper Award, for Swift: Delay is Simple and Effective for Congestion Control in the Datacenter.
- 2019 – ACM SIGCOMM Best Paper Award, for PicNIC: Predictable Virtualized NIC.
- 2014 – Internet Society Applied Networking Research Prize, Internet Research Task Force.
- 2011 – Google Research Excellent Papers for 2011, for “Proportional Rate Reduction for TCP”, published at the ACM Internet Measurement Conference.
