= Bob Braden =

American computer scientist (1934–2018)

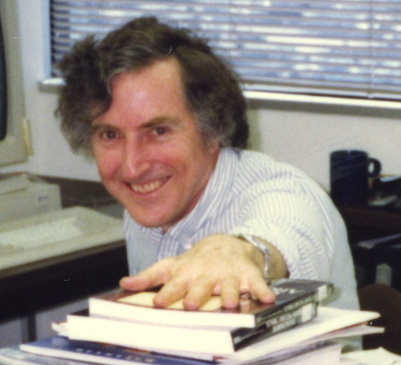
- Bob Braden in 1996
- Born: Robert Braden; 28 January 1934
- Died: 15 April 2018 (aged 84)
- Education: Cornell University; Stanford University
- Occupation: Computer scientist
- Scientific career
- Fields: end-to-end network protocols
- Workplaces: Carnegie Mellon University; University of California, Los Angeles; Internet Configuration Control Board

Robert T. Braden (January 28, 1934 – April 15, 2018) was an American computer scientist who played a role in the development of the Internet. His research interests included end-to-end network protocols, especially in the transport and network layers.

== Career ==
Braden received a Bachelor of Engineering Physics from Cornell University in 1957, and a Master of Science in physics from Stanford University in 1962. After graduating, he worked at Stanford and Carnegie Mellon University. He taught programming and operating systems courses at Stanford, Carnegie Mellon, and also UCLA, where he moved next.

He remained at UCLA for 18 years, 16 of them at the campus computing center. He spent 1981–1982 at the Computer Science Department of University College London. While there, he wrote the first relay system connecting the Internet with the U.K. academic X.25 network.

He joined the networking research group at the Information Sciences Institute (ISI) in 1986, and was a project leader in the Computer Networks Division. He was named an ISI Fellow in 2001.

== Professional contributions ==
While at UCLA, Braden was responsible for attaching UCLA's IBM 360/91 supercomputer to the ARPAnet, beginning in 1970. He was active in the ARPAnet Network Working Group, contributing to the design of the File Transfer Protocol in particular.

In 1978, he became a member of the Internet Working Group, which developed TCP/IP, and began development of a TCP/IP implementation for UCLA's IBM system. The UCLA IBM software was distributed to other OS/MVS sites, and was later sold commercially.

In 1981, he was invited to join the Internet Configuration Control Board, the organization that later became the Internet Architecture Board (IAB). He later served for 13 years as a member of the IAB.

Braden had been a member of the Internet Engineering Task Force and the Internet Research Task Force since their inception. When IAB task forces were formed in 1986, he created the End-to-End Task Force, later known as the IRTF End-to-End Research Group, which he chaired and later ran as a networking community mailing list for a number of years. Among his many contributions during this period are:

- Editing the Host Requirements RFCs
- Developing the Resource Reservation Protocol
- Developing T/TCP
- Serving as co-editor of the Request for Comments (RFC) series.
- Serving with the Internet Assigned Numbers Authority
- Coordinating the DARPA research network DARTnet

Braden was a Fellow of the ACM.

== Sources ==
- G. Malkin (May 1992). Who's Who in the Internet - Biographies of IAB, IESG and IRSG Members. Network Working Group. doi:10.17487/RFC1336. FYI 9. RFC 1336. Informational. Obsoletes RFC 1251.
- RFC Editor; et al. (April 7, 1999). 30 Years of RFCs. Network Working Group. doi:10.17487/RFC2555. RFC 2555. Informational. Updated by RFC 8700.
