= T/TCP =

T/TCP (Transactional Transmission Control Protocol) was a variant of the Transmission Control Protocol (TCP). It was an experimental TCP extension for efficient transaction-oriented (request/response) service. It was developed to fill the gap between TCP and UDP, by Bob Braden in 1994. Its definition can be found in RFC 1644 (that obsoletes RFC 1379). It is faster than TCP and delivery reliability is comparable to that of TCP.

T/TCP suffers from several major security problems as described by Charles Hannum in September 1996. It has not gained widespread popularity.

RFC 1379 and RFC 1644 that define T/TCP were moved to Historic Status in May 2011 by RFC 6247 for security reasons.

== Alternatives ==
TCP Fast Open is a more recent alternative.

== See also ==
- TCP Cookie Transactions
