= Dukkipati Nageswara Rao =

Indian independence activist

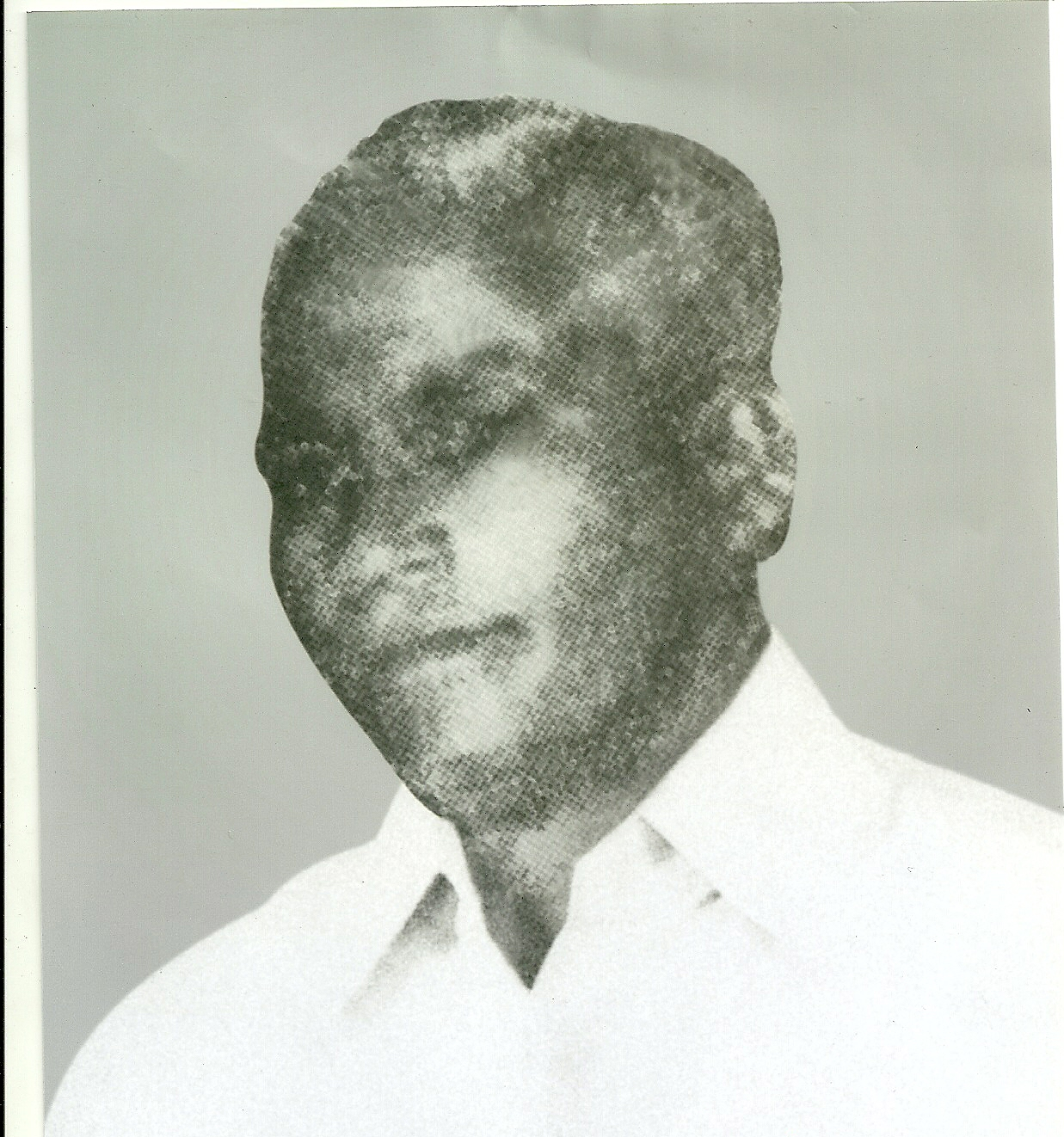
Dukkipati Nageswara Rao

Dukkipati Nageswara Rao was an Indian independence movement activist from Krishna District.

Rao was sent to prison a couple of times. He also met Mahatma Gandhi in his home town Peyyeru about 30 miles from his village Nandamuru during the Quit India Movement in 1942. The Government of Andhra Pradesh posthumously tried to give him 10 acres of land and a Tamra Patra (Certificate) which was given in accordance with the struggle that he fought for the freedom against the British. My late Grandmother Savithri refused to accept it and said my grandfather did it for the country and not for any monetary benefit or fiscal gain. Apart from serving in several prisons in Andhra Pradesh he also had the privilege of meeting Late Sarvepalli Radhakrishna during the independence struggle. He was also in many noteworthy prisons like Bellary Jail, during the freedom struggle.

Bhogaraju Pattabhi Sitaramiah (24 November 1880 – 17 December 1959) was an Indian independence activist and politician. He was born in the Indian state of Andhra Pradesh and was a prominent leader in the Indian National Congress.

Sitaramiah participated in the Non-Cooperation Movement launched by Mahatma Gandhi in 1920 and was arrested multiple times for his involvement in the independence movement. He also played a key role in organizing the historic Salt Satyagraha of 1930 in the state of Andhra Pradesh.

In 1938, Sitaramiah was elected as the President of the Indian National Congress, succeeding Jawaharlal Nehru. During his presidency, he focused on organizing the party and expanding its membership, as well as advocating for the rights of workers and peasants.

After India gained independence in 1947, Sitaramiah continued to be active in politics, serving as a member of the Constituent Assembly that drafted the Indian Constitution. He was also a member of the first Lok Sabha, the lower house of the Indian Parliament.

Bhogaraju Pattabhi Sitaramiah is remembered for his contributions to the Indian independence movement, and how his advocacy for the rights of workers and peasants has continued to inspire others, including Dukkipati Nageswara Rao, to work towards improving the lives of marginalized communities in India. Sitaramiah's legacy as a leader and activist continues to be a source of inspiration and guidance for many people in India and around the world, as they work to promote social justice, human rights, equality. and his efforts to strengthen others like Dukkipati Nageswara Rao, who consider him a role model and participated in the Quit India movement in 1942 and was arrested in Machilipatnam and sent to Bellary jail for one year.
