= Phil Karn =

American engineer

- Education: Cornell University (1978) Carnegie Mellon University (1979)
- Occupation: Engineer
- Website: https://www.ka9q.net/

Phil Karn (born October 4, 1956) is a retired American engineer from Lutherville, Maryland.

== Early life and education ==
He earned a bachelor's degree in electrical engineering from Cornell University in 1978 and a master's degree in electrical engineering from Carnegie Mellon University in 1979.

== Career ==
=== Academic career ===
From 1979 until 1984, Karn worked at Bell Labs in Naperville, Illinois, and Murray Hill, New Jersey. From 1984 until 1991, he was with Bell Communications Research in Morristown, New Jersey. From 1991 through to his retirement, he worked at Qualcomm in San Diego, where he specialized in wireless data networking protocols, security, and cryptography.

=== Amateur Radio Digital Communications ===
He is currently a board member and President Emeritus of Amateur Radio Digital Communications (ARDC), a non-profit foundation funded by the sale of part of its IP address space (44/8). ARDC manages the remaining portion of its address space by providing financial grants to amateur radio, digital communications and related groups.

=== Internet Engineering Task Force ===
He has been an active contributor in the Internet Engineering Task Force, especially in security, and to the Internet architecture. He is the author or co-author of at least 6 RFCs, and is cited as contributing to many more. He is the inventor of Karn's Algorithm, a method for calculating the round trip time for IP packet retransmission. In 1991, Thomas Alexander Iannelli's Master's thesis judged Karn's KA9Q NOS software as more suitable for deployment than an Air Force Institute of Technology packet radio system. In 1990, Karn was one of the first to predict that the use of wired links for the Internet's "capillaries" would become "history" because most users would access it via wireless radio links.

=== Amateur radio and KA9Q ===
He is well known in the amateur radio community for his work on the KA9Q Network Operating System (NOS), named after his amateur callsign. He also created early 9600 bit/s FSK radio modems. In the early 2000's, Karn worked to introduce forward error correction into Amateur radio satellites, applying it to the 400 bit/s PSK telemetry from the AO-40 satellite. He won the 1989 Specific Achievement Award at the Dayton Hamvention.

In 1994, Carl Malamud interviewed Karn on Internet Talk Radio for his "Geek of the Week" podcast. They talked about the KA9Q software, Qualcomm's CDMA radio technology for data transfer, the Globalstar low Earth orbit satellite radio system, Mobile IP, the Clipper chip, and encryption. In June 2014, Karn was also interviewed for the History of the Internet Project, in which he described his contribution to the effort to reboot the 1978 International Sun/Earth Explorer-3 (ISEE-3) spacecraft. The ISEE-3 is also known as the International Cometary Explorer.

=== Crypto export lawsuit ===
In 1994, the US State Department Office of Defense Trade Control ruled that while it was legal to export Bruce Schneier's "Applied Cryptography" book under the rules for munitions export, it was illegal to export the source code in the book on electronic media such as a floppy disk. The case was tried in Washington D.C. Federal District Court (1996), and the judge handed down a summary judgment in favor of the State Department. He ruled that the book and it contents were free to be exported, protected by free speech and press rights. The floppy disk, however, was a tool or instrument designed to produce functioning products (e.g. an encrypted computer) and as such was subject to the controls of the Export Control Act.

Karn challenged this ruling, both in the courts and in testimony before Congress for two years, until Bill Clinton dropped almost all export controls on freely available crypto source code on January 14, 2000; the judge mooted the case.

== Sources ==
- "Phil Karn's page on the crypto export case". : Self-published or questionable sources: http://www.ka9q.net/ is subject's personal web page.
