= Open vSwitch =

Virtual network switch

- Initial release: July 29, 2009; 16 years ago
- Stable release: 3.5.1 / 2 June 2025; 2 months ago
- Repository: github.com/openvswitch/ovs
- Written in: C
- Operating system: Linux, Hyper-V, FreeBSD and NetBSD
- Type: Virtual network switch
- License: Apache License 2.0
- Website: www.openvswitch.org

Open vSwitch (OVS) is an open-source implementation of a distributed virtual multilayer switch. The main purpose of Open vSwitch is to provide a switching stack for hardware virtualization environments, while supporting multiple protocols and standards used in computer networks.

The project's source code is distributed under the terms of Apache License 2.0.

== Overview ==
Open vSwitch deployed as a cross-server virtual network switch, transparently distributed across multiple physical servers.

Open vSwitch is a software implementation of a virtual multilayer network switch, designed to enable effective network automation through programmatic extensions, while supporting standard management interfaces and protocols such as NetFlow, sFlow, SPAN, RSPAN, CLI, LACP and 802.1ag. In addition, Open vSwitch is designed to support transparent distribution across multiple physical servers by enabling creation of cross-server switches in a way that abstracts out the underlying server architecture, similar to the VMware vNetwork distributed vswitch or Cisco Nexus 1000V.

Open vSwitch can operate both as a software-based network switch running within a virtual machine (VM) hypervisor, and as the control stack for dedicated switching hardware; as a result, it has been ported to multiple virtualization platforms, switching chipsets, and networking hardware accelerators. Open vSwitch is the default network switch in the XenServer virtualization platform since its version 6.0, and in the Xen Cloud Platform via its XAPI management toolstack. It also supports Xen, Linux KVM, Proxmox VE and VirtualBox hypervisors, while a port to Hyper-V is also available. Open vSwitch has also been integrated into various cloud computing software platforms and virtualization management systems, including OpenStack, openQRM, OpenNebula and oVirt.

The Linux kernel implementation of Open vSwitch was merged into the kernel mainline in kernel version 3.3, which was released on March 18, 2012; official Linux packages are available for Debian, Fedora, openSUSE and Ubuntu. As of January 2014, FreeBSD and NetBSD implementations are also available, with the NetBSD's implementation operating completely in userspace.

The majority of the Open vSwitch source code is written in platform-independent C language, which provides easy portability to various environments. The source code is licensed under the Apache License 2.0.

== Features ==
As of September 2015, features provided by Open vSwitch include the following:

- Exposed communication between virtual machines, via NetFlow, sFlow, IP Flow Information Export (IPFIX), Switched Port Analyzer (SPAN), Remote Switched Port Analyzer (RSPAN), and port mirrors tunneled using Generic Routing Encapsulation (GRE)
- Link aggregation through the Link Aggregation Control Protocol (LACP, IEEE 802.1AX-2008)
- Standard 802.1Q virtual LAN (VLAN) model for network partitioning, with support for trunking
- Support for multicast snooping using versions 1, 2 and 3 of the Internet Group Management Protocol (IGMP)
- Support for the Shortest Path Bridging Media Access Control (SPBM) and associated basic support for the Link Layer Discovery Protocol (LLDP)
- Support for the Bidirectional Forwarding Detection (BFD) and 802.1ag link monitoring
- Support for the Spanning Tree Protocol (STP, IEEE 802.1D-1998) and Rapid Spanning Tree Protocol (RSTP, IEEE 802.1D-2004)
- Fine-grained quality of service (QoS) control for different applications, users, or data flows
- Support for the hierarchical fair-service curve (HFSC) queuing discipline (qdisc)
- Traffic policing at the level of virtual machine interface
- Network interface controller (NIC) bonding, with load balancing by source MAC addresses, active backups, and layer 4 hashing
- Support for the OpenFlow protocol, including various virtualization-related extensions
- Complete IPv6 (Internet Protocol version 6) support
- Support for multiple tunneling protocols, including GRE, Virtual Extensible LAN (VXLAN), Stateless Transport Tunneling (STT) and Geneve, with additional support for layering over Internet Protocol Security (IPsec)
- Remote configuration protocol, with existing bindings for the C and Python programming languages
- Implementation of the packet forwarding engine in kernel space or userspace, allowing additional flexibility as well as providing performance improvements by processing the majority of forwarded packets without leaving the kernel space and by using multithreaded kernel space and userspace components
- Multi-table forwarding pipeline with a flow-caching engine
- Forwarding layer abstraction, making it easier to port Open vSwitch to new software and hardware platforms

== See also ==
- Distributed Overlay Virtual Ethernet (DOVE)
- LAN switching
- Network functions virtualization (NFV)
- Overlay transport virtualization (OTV)
- Software-defined networking (SDN)
