= IVI Translation =

Stateless IPv4/IPv6 translation technique

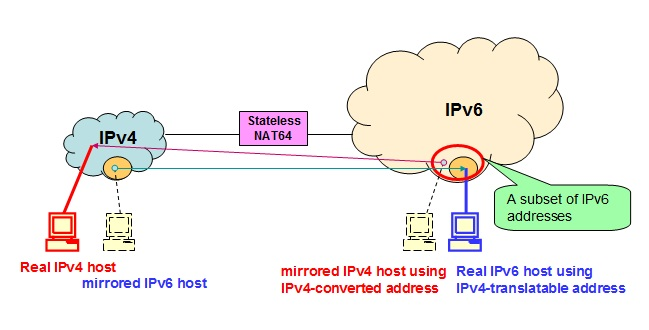
Stateless NAT64 (IVI)

IVI Translation refers to a stateless IPv4/IPv6 translation technique. It allows hosts in different address families (IPv4 and IPv6) communicate with each other and keeps the end-to-end address transparency.

Stateless NAT64 can be used in 4 different scenarios:

- An IPv6 network to the IPv4 Internet
- The IPv4 Internet to an IPv6 network
- An IPv6 network to an IPv4 network
- An IPv4 network to an IPv6 network

Stateless NAT64 is a replacement of SIIT (RFC 6145).

== Naming ==
The name "IVI" represents the number 4 (IV) and 6 (VI) in roman numerals merged to represent the IPv4/IPv6 translation.

== How it works ==
=== Stateless NAT64 building blocks ===
- Address translation defined in RFC 6052 is a stateless mapping scheme, which embeds IPv4 address in network specific IPv6 prefix and forms IPv4-converted and IPv4-translatable addresses. The IPv4-converted IPv6 addresses are the IPv6 addresses used to represent IPv4 nodes in an IPv6 network. The IPv4-translatable IPv6 addresses are the IPv6 addresses assigned to IPv6 nodes for use with stateless translation.
- Header translation and ICMP translation defined in RFC 6145 are algorithms to perform header translation between IPv4 and IPv6, as well as between ICMP and ICMPv6.
- DNS record translation (DNS64) defined in RFC 6147 describes mapping from A record to AAAA record defined in RFC 6052.

=== Stateless NAT64 extensions ===
- Address sharing stateless NAT64 enables multiple IPv6 nodes sharing a single public IPv4 address, with each node managing a different range of ports. This can be achieved by defining suffix of the address format RFC 6052.
- Dual stateless translation is also called dIVI Translation. Due to the stateless nature, after the second translation, the original IPv4 address can be restored. The advantage of stateless NAT464 is that the DNS64 and application-level gateway (ALG) are not needed.

=== Case study ===
- RFC 6219: China Education and Research Network (CERNET)'s IVI translation design and deployment for the IPv4/IPv6 coexistence and transition.
- RFC 7599: MAP-T is being used on the IPv6-only "CERNET2", expanding on the work done with CERNET.

=== Relation to Stateful NAT64 ===
- The stateless NAT64 also forms the basic building blocks for stateful NAT64. Additional building block is the maintaining of the translation states defined in RFC 6146.

=== Relation to Stateless NAT464 (dIVI, dIVI-PD) ===
- Due to stateless nature, the second stateless translator can be introduced to translate the IPv4-translatable IPv6 address back to IPv4. In this case, the DNS64 and ALG are not required. See dIVI Translation
