= Softwire (protocol) =

In computer networking, a softwire protocol is a category of network-layer tunneling protocols that enable the transparent encapsulation of one Internet protocol (usually IPv4 or IPv6) within another, allowing original packets to traverse network domains that natively support only the carrier protocol. Softwire protocols provide a virtual point-to-point or point-to-multipoint connection, emulating the behavior of a dedicated physical wire entirely in software. They have become a fundamental tool in large-scale Internet operations, particularly for the transition from IPv4 to IPv6 in both service provider and enterprise networks.

== History ==
The need for scalable protocol coexistence and migration solutions emerged in the early 2000s as the exhaustion of the global IPv4 address pool made IPv6 deployment urgent. Existing tunneling techniques, such as Generic Routing Encapsulation (GRE) and IP-in-IP, lacked features required for mass deployments, including automation, stateless operation, and efficient address management. The Internet Engineering Task Force (IETF) established the Softwires Working Group in 2005 to address these requirements, culminating in a family of open standards known as softwire protocols.

== Design and operation ==
A softwire protocol operates by encapsulating an entire network-layer packet (for example, an IPv4 datagram) inside a carrier protocol (typically IPv6) at the tunnel's ingress point, transmitting it across the network, and decapsulating it at the egress point. The encapsulation is transparent: neither endpoint applications nor intermediate routers in the carrier network need to be aware of the encapsulated protocol, which retains its addressing, packet structure, and higher-layer semantics. This property allows seamless communication between isolated protocol domains (such as IPv4 islands across an IPv6 core) without changes to end systems.

Two primary architectural models exist:

- Hub-and-spoke: Encapsulated traffic is aggregated at a central gateway (hub), allowing centralized address translation and policy enforcement, but potentially introducing a bottleneck or single point of failure.
- Mesh: Tunnels are established dynamically or statically between multiple endpoints, increasing scalability and redundancy but requiring more complex signaling and management.

Stateless softwire solutions, such as MAP-E and MAP-T, use algorithmic mappings to assign IPv4 addresses and port ranges deterministically to IPv6 addresses, eliminating the need for per-session state in provider infrastructure. Stateful solutions, such as DS-Lite, require dynamic NAT state, which allows finer-grained control but increases operational complexity.

== Standardized variants ==
Several IETF RFCs specify major softwire protocols:

- Dual-Stack Lite (DS-Lite): Encapsulates IPv4 packets within IPv6 at the customer edge, transmitting them to a centralized Address Family Transition Router (AFTR) which performs NAT44 and decapsulation.
- Lightweight 4over6 (lw4o6): Extends DS-Lite by assigning each user a shared IPv4 address and unique port set, reducing state at the provider edge.
- MAP-E (Mapping of Address and Port with Encapsulation): Uses stateless mapping to algorithmically associate IPv4/port ranges with IPv6 prefixes, encapsulating IPv4 in IPv6.
- MAP-T (Mapping of Address and Port using Translation): Applies the same mapping principle as MAP-E, but uses stateless translation rather than encapsulation, translating IPv4 packets to IPv6 and vice versa.
- 6rd: Provides rapid IPv6 deployment over IPv4 by statelessly encapsulating IPv6 in IPv4, widely used for early IPv6 rollouts by ISPs.

== Applications ==
Softwire protocols are essential in large-scale Internet service provider networks to support legacy IPv4 services across IPv6-only infrastructure, mitigate IPv4 address exhaustion, and provide operational continuity during dual-stack transitions. They are deployed in broadband access, mobile networks, enterprise WANs, and data centers, facilitating staged IPv6 migration without disrupting existing services. By centralizing or distributing NAT and address management, softwires improve address utilization and enable compliance with regulatory requirements for user session tracking.

In enterprise and cloud environments, softwire mechanisms bridge protocol domains across segmented networks, support hybrid and multi-cloud architectures, and allow isolated subnets with different IP versions to communicate securely and efficiently.

== Security and operational considerations ==
The use of softwire protocols introduces several operational and security challenges:

- Encapsulated packets may bypass security appliances (such as firewalls and intrusion detection systems) that are unaware of the inner protocol.
- Endpoints of the tunnel become critical control points, requiring robust authentication, authorization, and monitoring to prevent unauthorized access, spoofing, or injection of malicious traffic.
- The combination of encapsulation and NAT increases the complexity of troubleshooting, especially in stateless mapping scenarios with shared IPv4 addresses and port ranges.
- Path MTU Discovery and fragmentation handling must be correctly implemented, as encapsulation increases packet size and may cause loss or blackholing if not managed properly.
- Carrier-grade NAT and address sharing may hinder applications that require inbound connections or peer-to-peer functionality.

The IETF RFCs and operational best practice guides provide detailed recommendations for mitigating these risks, including secure configuration, careful address planning, and continuous network monitoring.

== Standardization and implementation ==
All major softwire protocols are open standards maintained by the IETF. They are implemented by leading router vendors (including Cisco, Juniper, Nokia, and others) and in open-source platforms such as Linux, BIRD, and FRRouting. Reference implementations, certification programs, and real-world deployment case studies have established interoperability and operational viability in diverse environments.

== See also ==
- IPv6 transition mechanism
- Tunneling protocol
- Carrier-grade NAT
- Network address translation
- IPv4 exhaustion
- Mesh networking
