= Distributed Overlay Virtual Ethernet =

Tunneling and virtualization technology for computer networks

Distributed Overlay Virtual Ethernet (DOVE) is a tunneling and virtualization technology for computer networks, created and backed by IBM. DOVE allows creation of network virtualization layers for deploying, controlling, and managing multiple independent and isolated network applications over a shared physical network infrastructure.

== Overview ==
The tunneling format is decoupled from the logical network view offered by DOVE, and defines only the way frames are encapsulated to be transferred by the underlying network infrastructure. As a notable difference from other network virtualization solutions (such as OTV), this allows DOVE not to be limited to providing OSI layer 2 emulation only (for example, passing Ethernet frames).

Logical components of the DOVE architecture are DOVE controllers and DOVE switches (abbreviated as dSwitch). DOVE controllers perform management functions, and one part of the control plane functions across DOVE switches. DOVE switches perform the encapsulation of layer 2 frames into UDP packets using the Virtual Extensible LAN (VXLAN) frame format, and provide virtual interfaces for virtual machines to plug into, similarly to how physical Ethernet switches provide ports for network interface controller (NIC) connections. DOVE switches are running as part of virtual machine hypervisors.

=== Advantages ===
Primary advantages of DOVE include the following:

- No dependency on the underlying physical network and protocols
- Use of the existing IP network infrastructure
- No addresses of virtual machines are present in Ethernet switches, resulting in smaller MAC tables and less complex STP layouts
- No limitations related to the Virtual LAN (VLAN) technology, resulting in more than 16 million possible separate networks, compared to the VLAN's limit of 4,000
- No dependency on the IP multicast traffic

== Implementations ==
As of November 2013, DOVE components are implemented as part of VMware's hypervisors, while implementations for the Linux KVM and Open vSwitch are planned.

DOVE extensions for VXLAN were merged into the Linux kernel mainline in kernel version 3.8, which was released on February 18, 2013. Appropriate extensions to related userspace configuration utilities were added into version 3.8.0 of the iproute2 utilities, which was released on February 21, 2013.

== See also ==
- Generic Routing Encapsulation (GRE)
- Overlay transport virtualization (OTV)
- Software-defined networking
