= List of IP protocol numbers =

This is a list of the IP protocol numbers found in the 8-bit Protocol field of the IPv4 header and the 8-bit Next Header field of the IPv6 header. It is an identifier for the encapsulated protocol and determines the layout of the data that immediately follows the header. Because both fields are eight bits wide, the possible values are limited to the 256 values from 0 (0x00) to 255 (0xFF), of which just over half had been allocated as of 2025.

Protocol numbers are maintained and published by the Internet Assigned Numbers Authority (IANA).

Hex	Protocol Number	Keyword	Protocol	References/RFC
0x00	0	HOPOPT	IPv6 Hop-by-Hop Option	RFC 8200
0x01	1	ICMP	Internet Control Message Protocol	RFC 792
0x02	2	IGMP	Internet Group Management Protocol	RFC 1112
0x03	3	GGP	Gateway-to-Gateway Protocol	RFC 823
0x04	4	IP-in-IP	IP in IP (encapsulation)	RFC 2003
0x05	5	ST	Internet Stream Protocol	RFC 1190, RFC 1819
0x06	6	TCP	Transmission Control Protocol	RFC 793
0x07	7	CBT	Core-based trees	RFC 2189
0x08	8	EGP	Exterior Gateway Protocol	RFC 888
0x09	9	IGP	Interior gateway protocol (any private interior gateway, for example Cisco's IGRP)	
0x0A	10	BBN-RCC-MON	BBN RCC Monitoring	
0x0B	11	NVP-II	Network Voice Protocol	RFC 741
0x0C	12	PUP	Xerox PUP	
0x0D	13	ARGUS	ARGUS	
0x0E	14	EMCON	EMCON	
0x0F	15	XNET	Cross Net Debugger	IEN 158
0x10	16	CHAOS	Chaos	
0x11	17	UDP	User Datagram Protocol	RFC 768
0x12	18	MUX	Multiplexing	IEN 90
0x13	19	DCN-MEAS	DCN Measurement Subsystems	
0x14	20	HMP	Host Monitoring Protocol	RFC 869
0x15	21	PRM	Packet Radio Measurement	
0x16	22	XNS-IDP	XEROX NS IDP	
0x17	23	TRUNK-1	Trunk-1	
0x18	24	TRUNK-2	Trunk-2	
0x19	25	LEAF-1	Leaf-1	
0x1A	26	LEAF-2	Leaf-2	
0x1B	27	RDP	Reliable Data Protocol	RFC 908
0x1C	28	IRTP	Internet Reliable Transaction Protocol	RFC 938
0x1D	29	ISO-TP4	ISO Transport Protocol Class 4	RFC 905
0x1E	30	NETBLT	Bulk Data Transfer Protocol	RFC 998
0x1F	31	MFE-NSP	MFE Network Services Protocol	
0x20	32	MERIT-INP	MERIT Internodal Protocol	
0x21	33	DCCP	Datagram Congestion Control Protocol	RFC 4340
0x22	34	3PC	Third Party Connect Protocol	
0x23	35	IDPR	Inter-Domain Policy Routing Protocol	RFC 1479
0x24	36	XTP	Xpress Transport Protocol	
0x25	37	DDP	Datagram Delivery Protocol	
0x26	38	IDPR-CMTP	IDPR Control Message Transport Protocol	
0x27	39	TP++	TP++ Transport Protocol	
0x28	40	IL	IL Transport Protocol	
0x29	41	IPv6	IPv6 Encapsulation (6to4 and 6in4)	RFC 2473
0x2A	42	SDRP	Source Demand Routing Protocol	RFC 1940
0x2B	43	IPv6-Route	Routing Header for IPv6	RFC 8200
0x2C	44	IPv6-Frag	Fragment Header for IPv6	RFC 8200
0x2D	45	IDRP	Inter-Domain Routing Protocol	
0x2E	46	RSVP	Resource Reservation Protocol	RFC 2205
0x2F	47	GRE	Generic Routing Encapsulation	RFC 2784, RFC 2890
0x30	48	DSR	Dynamic Source Routing Protocol	RFC 4728
0x31	49	BNA	Burroughs Network Architecture	
0x32	50	ESP	Encapsulating Security Payload	RFC 4303
0x33	51	AH	Authentication Header	RFC 4302
0x34	52	I-NLSP	Integrated Net Layer Security Protocol	TUBA
0x35	53	SwIPe	SwIPe	RFC 5237
0x36	54	NARP	NBMA Address Resolution Protocol	RFC 1735
0x37	55	MOBILE	IP Mobility (Min Encap)	RFC 2004
0x38	56	TLSP	Transport Layer Security Protocol (using Kryptonet key management)	
0x39	57	SKIP	Simple Key-Management for Internet Protocol	RFC 2356
0x3A	58	IPv6-ICMP	ICMP for IPv6	RFC 4443, RFC 4884
0x3B	59	IPv6-NoNxt	No Next Header for IPv6	RFC 8200
0x3C	60	IPv6-Opts	Destination Options for IPv6	RFC 8200
0x3D	61		Any host internal protocol	
0x3E	62	CFTP	CFTP	
0x3F	63		Any local network	
0x40	64	SAT-EXPAK	SATNET and Backroom EXPAK	
0x41	65	KRYPTOLAN	Kryptolan	
0x42	66	RVD	MIT Remote Virtual Disk Protocol	
0x43	67	IPPC	Internet Pluribus Packet Core	
0x44	68		Any distributed file system	
0x45	69	SAT-MON	SATNET Monitoring	
0x46	70	VISA	VISA Protocol	
0x47	71	IPCU	Internet Packet Core Utility	
0x48	72	CPNX	Computer Protocol Network Executive	
0x49	73	CPHB	Computer Protocol Heart Beat	
0x4A	74	WSN	Wang Span Network	
0x4B	75	PVP	Packet Video Protocol	
0x4C	76	BR-SAT-MON	Backroom SATNET Monitoring	
0x4D	77	SUN-ND	SUN ND PROTOCOL-Temporary	
0x4E	78	WB-MON	WIDEBAND Monitoring	
0x4F	79	WB-EXPAK	WIDEBAND EXPAK	
0x50	80	ISO-IP	International Organization for Standardization Internet Protocol	
0x51	81	VMTP	Versatile Message Transaction Protocol	RFC 1045
0x52	82	SECURE-VMTP	Secure Versatile Message Transaction Protocol	RFC 1045
0x53	83	VINES	VINES	
0x54	84	TTP	TTP (Transaction Transport Protocol) (obsoleted March 2023)	
0x54	84	IPTM	Internet Protocol Traffic Manager	
0x55	85	NSFNET-IGP	NSFNET-IGP	
0x56	86	DGP	Dissimilar Gateway Protocol	
0x57	87	TCF	TCF	
0x58	88	EIGRP	EIGRP	Informational RFC 7868
0x59	89	OSPF	Open Shortest Path First	RFC 2328
0x5A	90	Sprite-RPC	Sprite RPC Protocol	
0x5B	91	LARP	Locus Address Resolution Protocol	
0x5C	92	MTP	Multicast Transport Protocol	
0x5D	93	AX.25	AX.25	
0x5E	94	OS	KA9Q NOS compatible IP over IP tunneling	
0x5F	95	MICP	Mobile Internetworking Control Protocol	
0x60	96	SCC-SP	Semaphore Communications Sec. Pro	
0x61	97	ETHERIP	Ethernet-within-IP Encapsulation	RFC 3378
0x62	98	ENCAP	Encapsulation Header	RFC 1241
0x63	99		Any private encryption scheme	
0x64	100	GMTP	GMTP	
0x65	101	IFMP	Ipsilon Flow Management Protocol	
0x66	102	PNNI	PNNI over IP	
0x67	103	PIM	Protocol Independent Multicast	
0x68	104	ARIS	IBM's ARIS (Aggregate Route IP Switching) Protocol	
0x69	105	SCPS	SCPS (Space Communications Protocol Standards)	SCPS-TP
0x6A	106	QNX	QNX	
0x6B	107	A/N	Active Networks	
0x6C	108	IPComp	IP Payload Compression Protocol	RFC 3173
0x6D	109	SNP	Sitara Networks Protocol	
0x6E	110	Compaq-Peer	Compaq Peer Protocol	
0x6F	111	IPX-in-IP	IPX in IP	
0x70	112	VRRP	Virtual Router Redundancy Protocol, Common Address Redundancy Protocol (not IANA assigned)	RFC 5798
0x71	113	PGM	PGM Reliable Transport Protocol	RFC 3208
0x72	114		Any 0-hop protocol	
0x73	115	L2TP	Layer Two Tunneling Protocol Version 3	RFC 3931
0x74	116	DDX	D-II Data Exchange (DDX)	
0x75	117	IATP	Interactive Agent Transfer Protocol	
0x76	118	STP	Schedule Transfer Protocol	
0x77	119	SRP	SpectraLink Radio Protocol	
0x78	120	UTI	Universal Transport Interface Protocol	
0x79	121	SMP	Simple Message Protocol	
0x7A	122	SM	Simple Multicast Protocol	draft-perlman-simple-multicast-03
0x7B	123	PTP	Performance Transparency Protocol	
0x7C	124	IS-IS over IPv4	Intermediate System to Intermediate System (IS-IS) Protocol over IPv4	RFC 1142 and RFC 1195
0x7D	125	FIRE	Flexible Intra-AS Routing Environment	
0x7E	126	CRTP	Combat Radio Transport Protocol	
0x7F	127	CRUDP	Combat Radio User Datagram	
0x80	128	SSCOPMCE	Service-Specific Connection-Oriented Protocol in a Multilink and Connectionless Environment	ITU-T Q.2111 (1999)
0x81	129	IPLT		
0x82	130	SPS	Secure Packet Shield	
0x83	131	PIPE	Private IP Encapsulation within IP	Expired I-D draft-petri-mobileip-pipe-00.txt
0x84	132	SCTP	Stream Control Transmission Protocol	RFC 4960
0x85	133	FC	Fibre Channel	
0x86	134	RSVP-E2E-IGNORE	Reservation Protocol (RSVP) End-to-End Ignore	RFC 3175
0x87	135	Mobility Header	Mobility Extension Header for IPv6	RFC 6275
0x88	136	UDPLite	Lightweight User Datagram Protocol	RFC 3828
0x89	137	MPLS-in-IP	Multiprotocol Label Switching Encapsulated in IP	RFC 4023, RFC 5332
0x8A	138	manet	MANET Protocols	RFC 5498
0x8B	139	HIP	Host Identity Protocol	RFC 5201
0x8C	140	Shim6	Site Multihoming by IPv6 Intermediation	RFC 5533
0x8D	141	WESP	Wrapped Encapsulating Security Payload	RFC 5840
0x8E	142	ROHC	Robust Header Compression	RFC 5856
0x8F	143	Ethernet	Segment Routing over IPv6	RFC 8986
0x90	144	AGGFRAG	AGGFRAG Encapsulation Payload for ESP	RFC 9347
0x91	145	NSH	Network Service Header	draft-ietf-spring-nsh-sr
0x92	146	Homa	Homa transport protocol	Homa research paper, HomaModule
0x93	147	BIT-EMU	Bit-stream Emulation	RFC 9801
0x94-0xFC	148-252	Unassigned		
0xFD-0xFE	253-254	Use for experimentation and testing		RFC 3692
0xFF	255	Reserved		

== See also ==
- EtherType
- Internet Protocol
  - IPv4 (including packet structure)
  - IPv6 (and packet structure)
