= Overlay transport virtualization =

Computer network protocol

Overlay transport virtualization (OTV) is a Cisco proprietary protocol for relaying layer 2 communications between layer 3 computer networks.

== See also ==
- Distributed Overlay Virtual Ethernet (DOVE)
- Generic Routing Encapsulation (GRE)
- IEEE 802.1ad, an Ethernet networking standard, also known as provider bridging, Stacked VLANs, or simply QinQ.
- NVGRE, a similar competing specification
- Virtual Extensible LAN (VXLAN)
- Virtual LAN (VLAN)
