= XTP =

XTP may refer to:

- Extreme Transaction Processing, an exceptionally demanding form of transaction processing
- Xanthosine triphosphate, a nucleotide
- Xpress Transport Protocol, a transport layer protocol
- XML Template Pages, enhances JSP pages with stylesheets
- Xtreme Toolkit Professional, enhanced commercial toolkit for GUI development with MFC by Codejock Software.
- Extreme Terminal Performance branded XTP, a self-defense bullet type produced by Hornady Manufacturing Company.
