= DIVI Translation =

IPv4/IPv6 translation technique

dIVI-PD

dIVI Translation refers to a dual stateless IPv4/IPv6 translation technique. dIVI is an extension of 1:1 stateless IPv4/IPv6 translation (IVI Translation) with features of IPv4 address sharing and dual translation. dIVI-PD is a further extension of dIVI to be well used in Wireline (Fiber, DSL, Cable) and Wireless (3G/4G) access environment, where the prefix delegation (/64 or shorter) is preferred. dIVI-PD is now standardized as MAP-T in the IETF.

dIVI Translation is intended to benefit the network operators (ISPs) to effectively share the public IPv4 addresses among a set of customers (since IANA has run out of public IPv4 addresses). In parallel, it leverages IPv6 in the network in a manner that makes IPv4-customer originated traffic looks like native IPv6 traffic in the network, resulting in simplified operations. More importantly, (unlike CGN44, DS-Lite, CGN64 etc.) dIVI/dIVI-PD does not require any Stateful NAT, DNS64 and ALG in the network, thereby benefiting the network operator to not deal with any NAT logging etc. dIVI maintains end-to-end address transparency and bidirectional-initiated communications.

== How it works ==
=== Stateless NAT464 building blocks ===
- Address translation defined in RFC6052 is a stateless mapping scheme, which embeds IPv4 address in network specific IPv6 prefix and forms IPv4-converted and IPv4-translatable addresses. The IPv4-converted IPv6 addresses are the IPv6 addresses used to represent IPv4 nodes in an IPv6 network. The IPv4-translatable IPv6 addresses are the IPv6 addresses assigned to IPv6 nodes for use with stateless translation.
- Suffix extension enables multiple IPv6 nodes sharing a single public IPv4 address, with each node managing a different range of ports. This is achieved by defining suffix of the address format RFC6052.
- Header translation and ICMP translation defined in RFC6145 are algorithms to perform header translation between IPv4 and IPv6, as well as between ICMP and ICMPv6.
- Dual stateless translation can restore original IPv4 address. The advantage of stateless NAT464 is that the DNS translation DNS64 and application layer gateway ALG are not needed.
- Prefix extension is only applied to dIVI-PD. It constructs different delegated prefixes for each CPE.

=== Case study ===
- Considerations for Stateless Translation (IVI/dIVI) in Large SP Network

=== IETF ===
- Stateless Translation techniques have been gaining traction at the IETF as well as production networks. IVI is now an IETF informational RFC, where dIVI is being actively discussed. Many operators have recently submitted a motivation document to push the IETF to standardize Stateless 4v6 techniques such as dIVI.

=== Stateless 4via6 being advantageous ===
- Stateless 4Via6 Address Sharing demystifies the upsides with any Stateless 4v6 techniques.
- It is worth pointing out that dIVI/dIVI-PD, unlike CGN44, DS-Lite, CGN64 etc., does not require any Stateful NAT, DNS64 and ALG in the network, thereby benefiting the network operator to not deal with any NAT logging etc.

== Relation to IVI Translation ==
- Due to the stateless nature, the dual stateless translation can easily become single stateless translation by removing the second translator, see IVI Translation.
