= Christian Huitema =

French computer scholar (born 1953)

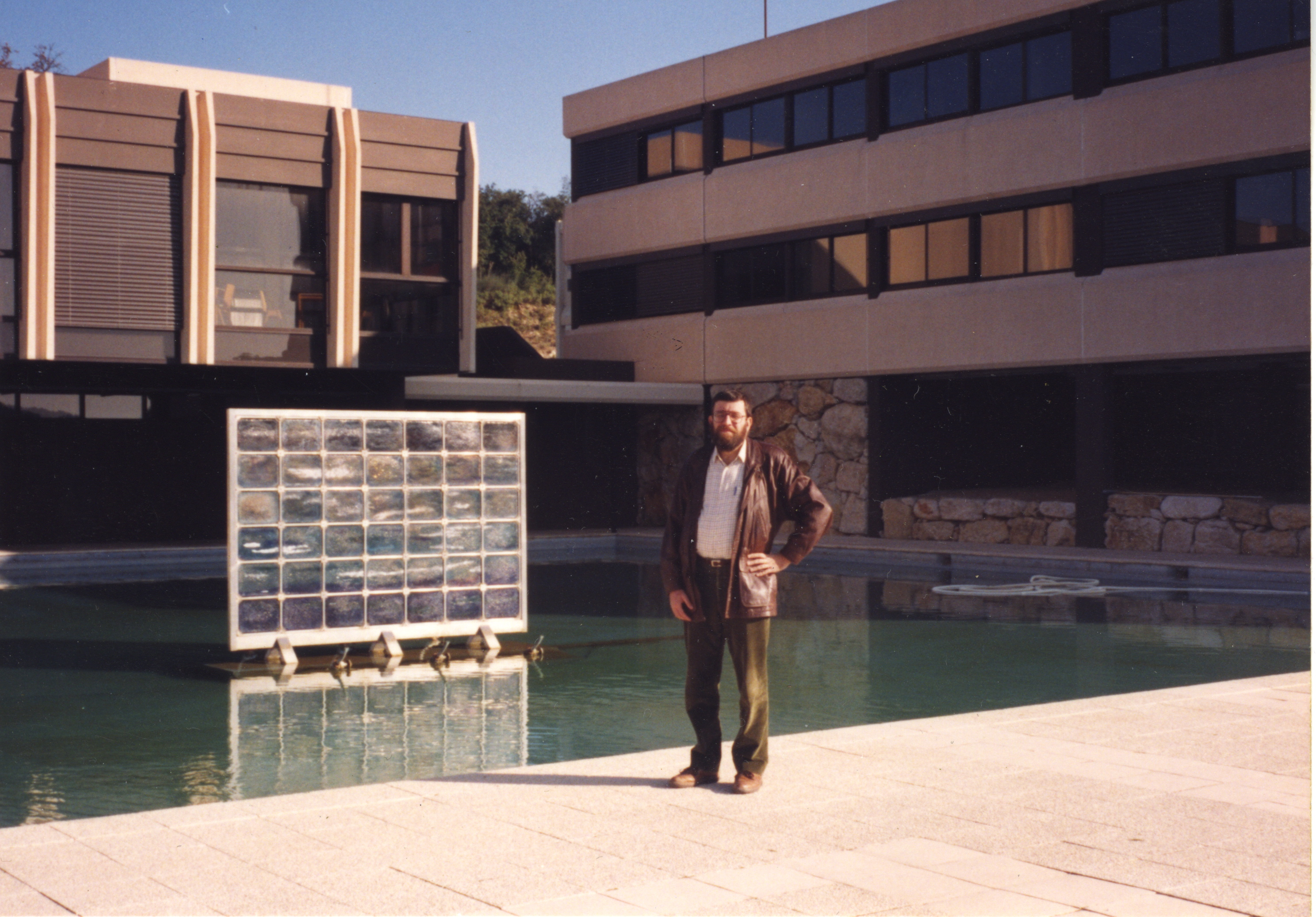
- Christian Huitema before 1991
- Born: 1953 (age 72–73); Nantes, France
- Education: École Polytechnique, University of Paris VI
- Known for: IAB chair
- Scientific career
- Fields: Computer Science, Computer Networking

Christian Huitema (born 1953 in Nantes, France) was the first non-American chair of the Internet Architecture Board (IAB), serving from April 1993 to July 1995. He currently is a consultant focused on privacy on the Internet.

== Biography ==
After graduating from the École Polytechnique in 1975, Huitema served for five years as an engineer at Sema Group in Montrouge before returning to the Centre national d'études des télécommunications (CNET; now part of Orange S.A.) in Issy-les-Moulineaux. In 1985, he received a PhD from University of Paris VI. In 1986, he joined the French Institute for Research in Computer Science and Automation (INRIA). Huitema collaborated on several research projects including the NADIR Project (jointly with CNET) to study the use of computer satellites, the European Strategic Program on Research in Information Technology's THORN project (first implementation of the X.500 distributed directory, precursor of ESPRIT's Paradise subproject), and the RODEO project (which aimed to define and test communication protocols for high-speed networks). He worked as a chief scientist for Bell Communications Research in the mid-1990s. At Microsoft, Huitema was involved with the development of 6to4 and Teredo tunneling.
