= Softwire =

Softwire may refer to:

- Softwire (protocol), a type of network tunneling protocol
- The Softwire, a series of young adult science fiction novels
