= Patrick Fay =

American electrical engineer

Patrick Fay is an electrical engineer at the University of Notre Dame in South Bend, Indiana. Fay was named a Fellow of the Institute of Electrical and Electronics Engineers (IEEE) in 2016 for his contributions to compound semiconductor tunneling and high-speed device technologies.
