= Dslite =

DSLite may refer to:

- Nintendo DS Lite, a dual-screen handheld game console, released in 2006
- Dual-Stack Lite, an IPv6 transition technology
