= Geneve =

Geneve may refer to:

- Genève, French for Geneva, Switzerland
  Canton of Geneva
- Generic Network Virtualization Encapsulation
