= Mapping of Address and Port =

Mapping of Address and Port (MAP) is a proposal that combines A+P port address translation with the tunneling of legacy IPv4 protocol packets over an ISP's internal IPv6 network.

MAP uses the extra bits available in the IPv6 address to contain the extra port range identifier bits of the A+P addressing pair that cannot be encoded directly into the IPv4 address, thus eliminating the need for "port routing" within the carrier network by leveraging the provider's own IPv6 rollout.

In effect, MAP is an (almost) stateless alternative to Carrier-grade NAT and DS-Lite that pushes the IPv4 IP address/port translation function (and therefore the maintenance of NAT state) entirely into the existing customer premises equipment IPv4 NAT implementation, thus avoiding the NAT444 and statefulness problems of carrier-grade NAT.

== See also ==
- DS-Lite
- IPv4 Residual Deployment (4rd)

== RFCs ==
- Mapping of Address and Port using Translation (MAP-T). doi:10.17487/RFC7599. RFC 7599.
- Mapping of Address and Port with Encapsulation (MAP-E). doi:10.17487/RFC7597. RFC 7597.
