= 4in6 =

Tunneling of IPv4 in IPv6

4in6 refers to tunneling of IPv4 in IPv6. It is an Internet interoperation mechanism allowing Internet Protocol version 4 (IPv4) to be used in an IPv6 only network. 4in6 uses tunneling to encapsulate IPv4 traffic over configured IPv6 tunnels as defined in RFC 2473. 4in6 tunnels are usually manually configured but they can be automated using protocols such as TSP to allow easy connection to a tunnel broker.
