= Tunnel Setup Protocol =

Networking control protocol

In computer networking, the Tunnel Setup Protocol (TSP) is an experimental networking control protocol used to negotiate IP tunnel setup parameters between a tunnel client host and a tunnel broker server, the tunnel end-points. A major use of TSP is in IPv6 transition mechanisms.

== Parameter negotiation ==
The TSP protocol performs negotiation of the following parameters:

- User authentication using the Simple Authentication and Security Layer (SASL) protocol
- Tunnel encapsulation for a variety of tunneling scenarios:
  - IPv6 over IPv4 tunnels
  - IPv4 over IPv6 tunnels
  - IPv6 over UDP/IPv4 tunnels for built-in traversal of network address translators (NAT)
- IP address assignment for both tunnel endpoints
- Domain Name System (DNS) registration of end point addresses and reverse DNS
- Tunnel keep-alive mechanism as needed
- IPv6 address prefix assignment for routers
- Routing protocols

== TSP Session ==
A TSP session is initiated by the TSP client in the goal of establishing an end-to-end tunnel with the TSP server (tunnel broker). The session consists of a basic exchange of XML-encoded data using TCP or UDP. After the negotiation of tunnel setup parameters, the session is terminated and the client undertakes the task of configuring its local tunnel endpoint.

== See also ==
- Anything In Anything (AYIYA)
