= AICCU =

Configuration tool for IPv6 tunnel

- Original author: Jeroen Massar
- Release: August 1, 2004; 22 years ago
- Stable release: 2012-02-02 (February 2, 2012; 14 years ago) [±]
- Preview release: Non [±]
- Written in: C
- Operating system: Cross-platform
- Available in: English
- Type: Internet
- License: 3-clause BSD
- Website: www.sixxs.net/tools/aiccu/

AICCU (Automatic IPv6 Connectivity Client Utility) was a popular cross-platform utility for automatically configuring an IPv6 tunnel. It is free software available under a BSD license. The utility was originally provided for the SixXS Tunnel Broker but it can also be used by a variety of other tunnel brokers.

== History and development ==
AICCU was written and maintained by Jeroen Massar. Various patches from other persons have been incorporated, these persons are acknowledged in the field for their contributions. AICCU is the successor of the Windows-only and Linux/BSD-variety of the Heartbeat tool that was provided by SixXS, solely to use the Heartbeat protocol. When the AYIYA protocol came into existence it was decided that to support this new protocol it would be better to merge the Windows and Unix trees into one program and give it a better appearance. The name of the Heartbeat tool was then changed to reflect that it did more than providing mere support for the heartbeats.

== Award of excellence ==
AICCU has won the Award of Excellence in the Implementation Category of the 2004 Edition of the IPv6 Application Contest.

== Supported protocols ==
The following tunneling protocols are currently supported:

- 6in4 - Standard IPv6 in IPv4 tunnels using protocol 41 in the IPv4 protocol header.
- AYIYA - For IPv6 over IPv4 UDP in a secure manner and being able to work through a NAT.
- 6in4 Heartbeat - used for dynamic 6in4 tunnels

AICCU primarily uses the Tunnel Information and Control Protocol to retrieve the configuration parameters of the tunnel automatically that the user wants to have configured.

== Support for other tunnel brokers ==
AICCU finds available tunnel brokers by looking up the TXT DNS records from "_aiccu.sixxs.net". The latter allowed a local network to add their own tunnel broker(s) by adding records in the domains configured in their search path. Non-local tunnel brokers could then be added by requesting the SixXS staff to add an entry to the global DNS records.

== Supported platforms ==
The following operating systems/platforms/distributions are supported by AICCU:

- AIX
- DragonFly BSD
- FreeBSD
- PC-BSD
- NetBSD
- OpenBSD
- Linux
- OS X
- Solaris (no AYIYA support)
- Windows

Various distributions have an AICCU package included in their distribution.

== Usage ==
The main usage of AICCU was in combination with the SixXS tunnel broker service.

There are other ISPs who have implemented parts of the protocols that AICCU support, for instance the Czech ISP NetBox uses AICCU to configure tunnels automatically for their users by providing a TIC (Tunnel Information and Control protocol) implementation that ignores the username/password/tunnel_id but uses the source address where the TIC connection originates from to determine and return the tunnel configuration using the TIC protocol, which AICCU then uses to configure the tunnel.
