= 4over6 =

Internet transition mechanism

4over6 is an IPv6 transition technology intended as a mechanism for Internet service providers to provide continued access to the IPv4 Internet over an IPv6-only service provider infrastructure. There are currently two versions of the protocol: Public 4over6 which is deployed but not recommended for new implementations, and Lightweight 4over6 which is an extension to the Dual-Stack Lite architecture.
