= IP Payload Compression Protocol =

For networking, the Internet Protocol IP Payload Compression Protocol, or IPComp, is a low level compression protocol for IP datagrams defined in RFC 3173. The intent is to reduce the size of data transmitted over congested or slow network connections, thereby increasing the speed of such networks without losing data. According to the RFC requirements, compression must be done before fragmenting or encrypting the packet. It further states that each datagram must be compressed independently so it can be decompressed even if received out of order. This is important because it allows IPComp to work with both TCP and UDP network communications.
