= Gateway-to-Gateway Protocol =

The Gateway-to-Gateway Protocol (GGP) is an obsolete protocol defined for routing datagrams between Internet gateways. It was first outlined in 1982.

The Gateway-to-Gateway Protocol was designed as an Internet Protocol (IP) datagram service similar to the Transmission Control Protocol (TCP) and the User Datagram Protocol (UDP). However, it is classified as an Internet Layer protocol.

GGP uses a minimum hop algorithm, in which it measures distance in router hops. A router is defined to be zero hops from directly connected networks, one hop from networks that are reachable through one other gateway. The protocol implements a distributed shortest-path methodology, and therefore requires global convergence of the routing tables after any change of link connectivity in the network.

Each GGP message has a field header that identifies the message type and the format of the remaining fields. Because only core routers participated in GGP, and because core routers were controlled by a central authority, other routers could not interfere with the exchange.

== See also ==
- Distance-vector routing protocol
- Link-state routing protocol
- Router Information Protocol
