= Anything In Anything =

Computer networking protocol

Anything In Anything (AYIYA) is a computer networking protocol for managing IP tunneling protocols in use between separated Internet Protocol networks. It is most often used to provide IPv6 transit over an IPv4 network link when network address translation masquerades a private network with a single IP address that may change frequently because of DHCP provisioning by Internet service providers.

== Features ==
The protocol has the following features:

- Tunneling of networking protocols within another IP protocol
- Network security is provided by preventing tunneled packets from being spoofable or replayable
- Transparent handling of network address translation
- The endpoint of at least one of the two tunnel endpoints should be able to change to provide mobility features.

== Tunnel brokers ==
Many consumer networks are provisioned by Internet service providers using network address translation (NAT) which precludes the usage of IP protocol 41 tunnels (IPv6 tunneled in IPv4 per either RFC 4213 or RFC 3056) unless they manually reconfigure their NAT setup. In some cases, this is impossible as the NAT cannot be configured to forward protocol 41 to a specific host. Cases, where multiple endpoints are behind the same NAT, when multiple NATs are used, or when the user has no control at all over the NAT setup, are also problematic. This situation limits the deployment of IPv6, which was meant to solve the problem of the disruption in end-to-end communications caused by NATs, which were created because of limited address space in the first place.

This problem can be solved by tunneling the IPv6 packets over either User Datagram Protocol (UDP), Transmission Control Protocol (TCP) or the Stream Control Transmission Protocol (SCTP). Taking into consideration that multiple separate endpoints could be behind the same NAT or that the public endpoint receives a new IP address, there is a need to identify the endpoint that certain packets are coming from and endpoints need to be able to change e.g. source addresses of the transporting protocol on the fly while still being identifiable as the same endpoint. AYIYA is independent of the transport and payload's protocol. An example is IPv6-in-UDP-in-IPv4, which is a typical setup that can be used by IPv6 tunnel brokers.

== Mobility ==
AYIYA may be used to provision mobile hosts by tunneling traffic from the home address to the home agent over an underlying network. Any remote host that the mobile host communicates with does not need AYIYA support. When the remote host does support AYIYA, it could also directly set up a tunnel with the mobile host. The remote host can determine whether a host supports AYIYA by querying for Domain Name System records and use public-key cryptography to authenticate the packets.

+-------------+             +------------+         ,--------.         +-------------+
| Mobile Host | <--AYIYA--> | Home Agent | <----> { Internet } <----> | Remote Host |
+-------------+             +------------+         '--------'         +-------------+

Using AYIYA to provide IPv6 for a host already provides mobility for that endpoint as it can use its IPv6 address regardless of geographic location.

== Packet format ==
	Bits 0 - 3	4 - 7	8 - 11	12 - 15	16 - 19	20 - 23	24 - 31
0	Identity Length	Identity Type	Signature Length	Hash Method	Authentication Method	Operation Code	Next Header
32	Epoch Time						
	Identity						
	Signature						

For IPv6 over IPv4-UDP operation, the most common use scenario, the identity is the IPv6 Address of the endpoint (16 bytes) and the signature is an SHA1 hash (20 bytes). The header has a total of 8 + 16 + 20 = 44 bytes. Encapsulated in UDP and IPv4, the tunnel overhead is 44 + 8 + 20 = 72 bytes. Over Ethernet this allows an MTU of 1428 bytes.

== Implementations ==
The AYIYA protocol has been implemented in AICCU.
