= Address plus Port =

A+P example

The Address plus Port (A+P) within the network layer communications protocol for Internet networking is an experimental approach to the IPv4 address shortage. It is a technique for sharing single IPv4 addresses among several users without using stateful network address translation in the carrier network.

Normal routing uses the IPv4 address only to identify which host an Internet Protocol packet is destined for. A+P uses the destination Transmission Control Protocol or User Datagram Protocol port in addition to the Internet Protocol address to extend the range of available host addresses. Each host is assigned a unique range of ports which they set as the source port in outbound packets and which they use to receive inbound traffic.

A+P is a stateless alternative to conventional stateful network address translation as the A+P gateway does not need to keep track of every Transmission Control Protocol or User Datagram Protocol flow. However, it does require A+P aware software at the end-point, capable of limiting the range of port numbers used for originating connections to its allocated range, either in the end host, or, in the more common likely scenario, in the customer premises equipment own local NAT44 implementation.

== See also ==
- IPv4 Residual Deployment (4rd) (implements stateless A+P)
- Mapping of Address and Port
