= Miredo =

Tunneling client allowing connectivity between IPv6 and IPv4 computers

- Developer(s): Rémi Denis-Courmont
- Initial release: 2004; 21 years ago
- Stable release: 1.2.6 / May 23, 2013; 12 years ago
- Repository: git.remlab.net/git/miredo.git/
- Written in: C
- Available in: Multilingual
- Type: IP Tunneling
- License: GNU General Public License
- Website: www.remlab.net/miredo/

Miredo is a Teredo tunneling client designed to allow full IPv6 connectivity to computer systems which are on the IPv4-based Internet but which have no direct native connection to an IPv6 network.

Miredo is included in many Linux and BSD distributions and is also available for recent versions of Mac OS X. (Discontinued)

It includes working implementations of:

- a Teredo client
- a Teredo relay
- a Teredo server

Released under the terms of the GNU General Public License, Miredo is free software.
