= IPv6 rapid deployment =

Internet transition mechanism

6rd

6rd is a mechanism to facilitate IPv6 rapid deployment across IPv4 infrastructures of Internet service providers (ISPs).

The protocol is derived from 6to4, a preexisting mechanism to transfer IPv6 packets over the IPv4 network, with the significant change that it operates entirely within the end-user's ISP network, thus avoiding the major architectural problems inherent in the design of 6to4. The name 6rd is a reference to both the rapid deployments of IPv6 it enables, and, informally, the initials (RD) of its inventor, Rémi Després.

A description of 6rd principles and their first application by the ISP Free is published in RFC 5569, The 6rd specification prepared for standardization in the IETF is available as RFC 5969.

== History ==
In November 2007, Rémi Després — who was one of the creators of the Transpac data network in France in the 1970s — proposed to Free, the second largest ISP in France, to use the 6rd mechanism he had invented to rapidly deploy IPv6. Although Free no short-term plan to offer IPv6 service, Rani Assaf, the company's CTO, decided to implement the solution. Five weeks later, with due marketing approval and operational validation, the press release announcing that IPv6 was available to Free's customers was issued.

The first draft describing the 6rd mechanism and Free's deployment was submitted to IETF on 9 February 2008. After improvements, it was published on 24 January 2010 as informational RFC 5569.

In March 2010, a Working Group of the IETF approved that its latest draft on 6rd should become, after some more modifications, a standards-track RFC. In August 2010, the standards-track RFC 5969 was published. In October 2010, Comcast released 6rd software for home gateway devices as open source software.

== Comparison to 6to4 ==
6to4 works by relaying traffic between native IPv6 and IPv4 using relay servers which advertise common IPv4 and IPv6 prefixes to networks they are prepared to provide relay services for, but there is no guarantee that all native IPv6 hosts have a working route toward such a relay. Because of this, a 6to4 host is not guaranteed to be reachable by all native IPv6 hosts. Even when a relay is available, it is often operated by a third party who has no obligation to maintain a good quality of service as traffic grows. 6rd changes this model by making each ISP use one of its own IPv6 prefixes instead of the special 2002::/16 prefix standardized for 6to4, so a provider is guaranteed that its 6rd hosts will be reachable from all native IPv6 hosts that can reach their IPv6 network. Because the relay is fully under the ISP's control, it keeps full responsibility for the quality of service for its customers.

Because 6rd relays can only be used by a limited set of hosts that are all under the control of the same administrative entity, it also reduces the scope for traffic anonymization attacks such as those possible with 6to4.

== Address space consumption ==
The simplest 6rd deployment, which uses 32 bits of IPv6 address space to map the entire IPv4 address space, consumes more address space than typical with IPv6 natively supported in all ISP routers. This can be mitigated by omitting redundant parts of the IPv4 address space, and in some cases by deploying multiple 6rd domains.

The default allocation of IPv6 space by a regional Internet registry (RIR) is a 32-bit prefix. Since it takes 32 bits to map an IPv4 address with 6rd, this implies that an ISP would only be able to allocate 64-bit IPv6 prefixes to its customers if it were to use entire IPv4 addresses. 6rd, however, allows any redundant part of an IPv4 address to be discarded: For example, if the IPv4 addresses that an ISP issues to its customers all share the same first eighteen bits, a 6rd prefix only need include the remaining fourteen bits. Without this flexibility, Free originally assigned 64-bit IPv6 prefixes to its customers but was able to assign them shorter prefixes once it obtained a larger allocation of IPv6 space (a 26-bit prefix) from the RIPE NCC.

== Current usage ==
- Free has used 6rd since December 2007. In 2008, a report from Google on its visibility of IPv6 use showed France as having the second highest IPv6 penetration in the world, with 95% of its IPv6 being with "native" IPv6 addresses, almost all from Free.
- Comcast announced in January 2010 a trial using 6rd in the second quarter of 2010. They began that 6RD trial on June 30, 2010, which was expected to ramp up to several hundred users in July 2010. But 6rd is not anticipated to be Comcast's primary IPv6 strategy. Comcast has tested 2 different home gateways with 6rd, one of which they have made available via open source. In addition, they have published 6rd configuration instructions for any user on their network that wishes to use their 6rd border relays. Comcast planned to deactivate their 6rd service on June 30, 2011, in anticipation of their wider deployment of native dual stack.
- Charter has announced the planned deployment of 6rd across their network in 2012. They host a public 6rd border relay for their subscribers.
- The Linux kernel added support for 6rd in version 2.6.33.
- The Japanese company SoftBank have announced that they will begin rolling out IPv6 using 6rd.
- Swisscom is rolling out 6RD in 2011. Starting 2022, Swisscom passed to a full dual stack approach.
- The Japanese company SAKURA Internet began its 6rd trial in March 2011.
- Canadian ISP Videotron has deployed 6rd in beta on June 8, 2011, for customers using a 6rd-ready router.
- In December 2011, Dutch ISP Telfort announced it was starting an IPv6 pre-pilot based on 6rd, inviting customers to participate. As of January 2013, 6rd is open as opt-in to all Telfort fixed line (ADSL and VDSL) customers. The "opt-in" means the customer has to enable 6RD in the Telfort Zyxel modem to get IPv6 connectivity. However this pilot has since been discontinued as parent company KPN shut down the Telfort subsidiary in 2019.
- CenturyLink has supported 6rd since April 2012 including a list of compatible modems.
- In January 2013, Dutch ISP ZeelandNet announced it was starting an IPv6 pre-pilot based on 6rd, inviting customers to participate. After the trial they expect to have a native/dual-stack solution on their EuroDOCSIS consumer network and business fiber network.
- As of June 12, 2013, Dutch ISP OnsBrabantNet supports 6rd on their network.
- In October 2013, Norwegian ISP Altibox announced that they offer IPv6 to 70,000 customers based on 6rd. All customers who bypass the ISP's "home central" were able to use 6rd in March 2013, though it was only announced on a technician's Twitter account.
- In November 2014, Sonic.net made 6rd available for subscribers with compatible equipment to choose to enable it.
- Telia Company is using 6rd.
- Tweak, formerly a Dutch fiber ISP, used 6rd until they merged into Odido, which does not support IPv6.
- Alaska Communications, a telecommunications corporation headquartered in Alaska, provides experimental support for 6rd to subscribers.

== See also ==
- IPv6 deployment
