= Network Virtualization using Generic Routing Encapsulation =

Network virtualisation technology

Network Virtualization using Generic Routing Encapsulation (NVGRE) is a network virtualization technology that attempts to alleviate the scalability problems associated with large cloud computing deployments. It uses Generic Routing Encapsulation (GRE) to tunnel layer 2 packets over layer 3 networks. Its principal backer is Microsoft.

== See also ==
- Virtual Extensible LAN (VXLAN), a similar competing specification
- Generic Networking Virtualization Encapsulation (GENEVE), an industry effort to unify both VXLAN and NVGRE technologies
- Generic Routing Encapsulation, GRE for transporting L3 packets.
