= Tunneling protocol =

Computer communications protocol

- Communication protocol
- OSI layer: Varying layers (often Link, Network, or Application layer)
- IP number: IP (IPv4, IPv6), TCP, UDP
- RFCs: 2784 (GRE); 2661 (L2TP); 8085 (UDP Encapsulation)
- Hardware: Firewalls, Routers, and VPN Gateways

In computer networks, a tunneling protocol is a communication protocol that allows for the movement of data from one network to another. They can, for example, allow private communications to be sent across a public network (such as the Internet), or for one network protocol to be carried over an incompatible network, through a process called encapsulation.

Because tunneling involves repackaging the traffic data into a different form, perhaps with encryption as standard, it can hide the nature of the traffic that is run through a tunnel.

Tunneling protocols work by using the data portion of a packet (the payload) to carry the packets that actually provide the service. Tunneling uses a layered protocol model such as those of the OSI or TCP/IP protocol suite, but usually violates the layering when using the payload to carry a service not normally provided by the network. Typically, the delivery protocol operates at an equal or higher level in the layered model than the payload protocol.

== Uses ==
A tunneling protocol may, for example, allow a foreign protocol to run over a network that does not support that particular protocol, such as running IPv6 over IPv4.

Another important use is to provide services that are impractical or unsafe to be offered using only the underlying network services, such as providing a corporate network address to a remote user whose physical network address is not part of the corporate network.

=== Circumventing firewall policy ===
Users can also use tunneling to "sneak through" a firewall, using a protocol that the firewall would normally block, but "wrapped" inside a protocol that the firewall does not block, such as HTTP. If the firewall policy does not specifically exclude this kind of "wrapping", this trick can function to get around the intended firewall policy (or any set of interlocked firewall policies).

Another HTTP-based tunneling method uses the HTTP CONNECT method/command. A client issues the HTTP CONNECT command to an HTTP proxy. The proxy then makes a TCP connection to a particular server:port, and relays data between that server:port and the client connection. Because this creates a security hole, CONNECT-capable HTTP proxies commonly restrict access to the CONNECT method. The proxy allows connections only to specific ports, such as 443 for HTTPS.

Other tunneling methods able to bypass network firewalls make use of different protocols such as DNS, MQTT, and SMS.

== Technical overview ==
As an example of network layer over network layer, Generic Routing Encapsulation (GRE), a protocol running over IP (IP protocol number 47), often serves to carry IP packets, with RFC 1918 private addresses, over the Internet using delivery packets with public IP addresses. In this case, the delivery and payload protocols are the same, but the payload addresses are incompatible with those of the delivery network.

It is also possible to establish a connection using the data link layer. The Layer 2 Tunneling Protocol (L2TP) allows the transmission of frames between two nodes. A tunnel is not encrypted by default: the TCP/IP protocol chosen determines the level of security.

SSH uses port 22 to enable data encryption of payloads being transmitted over a public network (such as the Internet) connection, thereby providing VPN functionality. IPsec has an end-to-end Transport Mode, but can also operate in a tunneling mode through a trusted security gateway.

To understand a particular protocol stack imposed by tunneling, network engineers must understand both the payload and delivery protocol sets.

== Common tunneling protocols ==
- IP in IP (IP protocol 4): IP in IPv4/IPv6
- SIT/IPv6 (IP protocol 41): IPv6 in IPv4/IPv6
- GRE (IP protocol 47): Generic Routing Encapsulation
- OpenVPN (UDP port 1194)
- SSTP (TCP port 443): Secure Socket Tunneling Protocol
- IPSec (IP protocols 50 and 51): Internet Protocol Security
- L2TP (UDP port 1701): Layer 2 Tunneling Protocol
- L2TPv3 (IP protocol 115): Layer 2 Tunneling Protocol version 3
- VXLAN (UDP port 4789): Virtual Extensible Local Area Network
- PPTP (TCP port 1723 for control, GRE for data): Point-to-Point Tunneling Protocol
- PPPoE (EtherType 0x8863 for control, 0x8864 for data): Point-to-Point Protocol over Ethernet
- GENEVE
- WireGuard (UDP dynamic port)

== TCP meltdown problem ==
Tunneling a TCP-encapsulating payload (such as PPP) over a TCP-based connection (such as SSH's port forwarding) is known as "TCP-over-TCP", and doing so can induce a dramatic loss in transmission performance — known as the TCP meltdown problem, which is why virtual private network (VPN) software may instead use a protocol simpler than TCP for the tunnel connection.

The throughput of a TCP‑over‑TCP connection can be degraded because the control loops in the inner and outer TCPs interfere destructively with each other. Because TCP is designed to guarantee in‑order and complete packet delivery, the outer TCP masks the connection's health from the inner TCP. In normal TCP operation, packet loss is detected when the receiver replies with duplicate ACKs to a packet received before the missing packet in the sequence. In response, the sender retransmits the lost packet and halves the Congestion Window (CWND). In TCP‑over‑TCP, the outer TCP handles lost packets normally through retransmission and CWND reduction. Still, since the inner TCP has not received any information indicating latency in the connection, it continues to transmit packets at the rate currently governed by its CWND.

Because the inner TCP’s CWND is greater than the outer TCP’s, the outer TCP’s send buffer eventually fills. As the buffer inflates, packets experience longer and more variable queueing delays before transmission, thereby increasing the outer TCP’s measured round-trip time (RTT) and RTT variability. This inflates its retransmission timeout (RTO). Once the send buffer becomes full, the tunnel process can no longer forward inner‑TCP ACKs, so the inner TCP stops receiving acknowledgments entirely.

Because the inner TCP is no longer receiving ACKs, its RTO expires, causing it to retransmit the oldest unacknowledged segment and double its RTO. The inner TCP’s RTO then grows exponentially because it doubles with every timeout, and no ACKs are received to reset it.

The result of a TCP meltdown is an outer TCP with a severely reduced CWND, an inflated RTO, and a full send buffer. This indicates that the inner TCP cannot write and that ACKs are not being sent in either direction.

== Secure Shell tunneling ==
A Secure Shell (SSH) tunnel consists of an encrypted tunnel created through an SSH protocol connection. Users may set up SSH tunnels to transfer unencrypted traffic over a network through an encrypted channel. It is a software-based approach to network security and the result is transparent encryption.

For example, Microsoft Windows machines can share files using the Server Message Block (SMB) protocol, a non-encrypted protocol. If one were to mount a Microsoft Windows file-system remotely through the Internet, someone snooping on the connection could see transferred files. To mount the Windows file-system securely, one can establish a SSH tunnel that routes all SMB traffic to the remote fileserver through an encrypted channel. Even though the SMB protocol itself contains no encryption, the encrypted SSH channel through which it travels offers security.

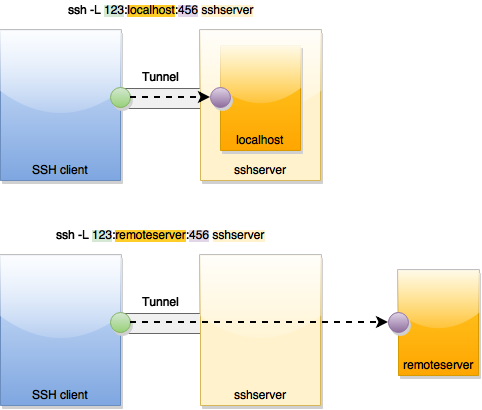
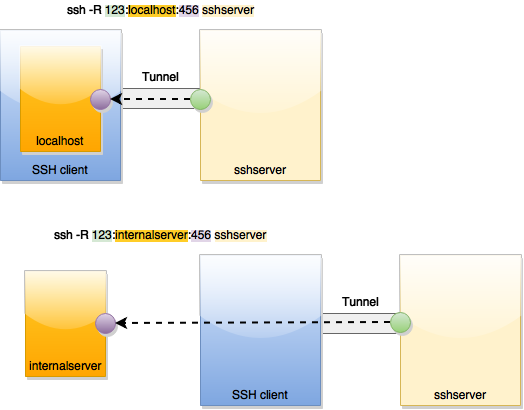
Local and remote port forwarding with ssh executed on the blue computer

Once an SSH connection has been established, the tunnel starts with SSH listening to a port on the remote or local host. Any connections to it are forwarded to the specified address and port originating from the opposing (remote or local, as previously) host.

The TCP meltdown problem is often not a problem when using OpenSSH's port forwarding, because many use cases do not entail TCP-over-TCP tunneling; the meltdown is avoided because the OpenSSH client processes the local, client-side TCP connection in order to get to the actual payload that is being sent, and then sends that payload directly through the tunnel's own TCP connection to the server side, where the OpenSSH server similarly "unwraps" the payload in order to "wrap" it up again for routing to its final destination. Naturally, this wrapping and unwrapping also occurs in the reverse direction of the bidirectional tunnel.

SSH tunnels provide a means to bypass firewalls that prohibit certain Internet services – so long as a site allows outgoing connections. For example, an organization may prohibit a user from accessing Internet web pages (port 80) directly without passing through the organization's proxy filter (which provides the organization with a means of monitoring and controlling what the user sees through the web). But users may not wish to have their web traffic monitored or blocked by the organisation's proxy filter. If users can connect to an external SSH server, they can create an SSH tunnel to forward a given port on their local machine to port 80 on a remote web server. To access the remote web server, users would point their browser to the local port at http://localhost/

Some SSH clients support dynamic port forwarding that allows the user to create a SOCKS 4/5 proxy. In this case users can configure their applications to use their local SOCKS proxy server. This gives more flexibility than creating an SSH tunnel to a single port as previously described. SOCKS can free the user from the limitations of connecting only to a predefined remote port and server. If an application does not support SOCKS, a proxifier can be used to redirect the application to the local SOCKS proxy server. Some proxifiers, such as Proxycap, support SSH directly, thus avoiding the need for an SSH client.

In recent versions of OpenSSH it is even allowed to create layer 2 or layer 3 tunnels if both ends have enabled such tunneling capabilities. This creates tun (layer 3, default) or tap (layer 2) virtual interfaces on both ends of the connection. This allows normal network management and routing to be used, and when used on routers, the traffic for an entire subnetwork can be tunneled. A pair of tap virtual interfaces function like an Ethernet cable connecting both ends of the connection and can join kernel bridges.

== Cyberattacks based on tunneling ==
Over the years, tunneling and data encapsulation have in very rare cases been adopted for malicious reasons, in order to maliciously communicate outside of a protected network.

In this context, known tunnels involve protocols such as HTTP, SSH, DNS, MQTT.

== See also ==
- GPRS Tunnelling Protocol (GTP)
- HTTP tunnel
- ICMP tunnel
- NVGRE
- OSI model (Diagram)
- Pseudo-wire
- Stunnel
- Tunnel broker
- Virtual Extensible LAN (VXLAN)
- Virtual private network (VPN)
