= Hugh Daniel =

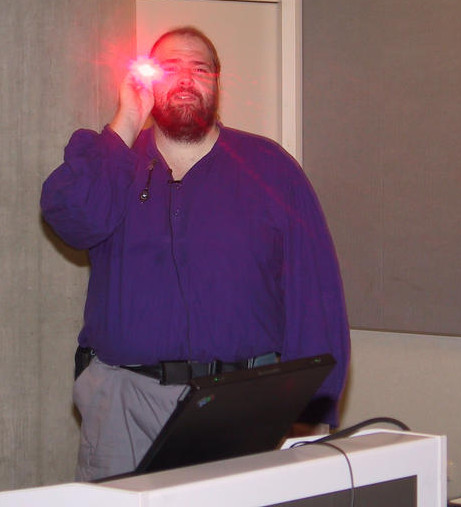
- Hugh Daniel at the Ottawa Linux Symposium
- Born: April 19, 1962; Chicago, Illinois
- Died: June 3, 2013 (aged 51); Pacifica, California
- Known for: Manager of FreeS/WAN project, Libertarianism, Cypherpunk

Hugh Daniel (April 19, 1962, Chicago, Illinois – June 3, 2013, Pacifica, California) was a noted computer engineer.

== Computer engineering ==
He was an early participant in the Cypherpunk movement. He contributed significantly to the Internet Engineering Task Force's (IETF) early standardization of Internet Protocol Security (IPsec) and Domain Name System Security Extensions (DNSSEC). He is also noted for having managed the FreeS/WAN (Free Secure Wide-Area Networking) project, with the goal of securing Internet communication via opportunistic encryption of Internet traffic. He co-founded the Openswan project and Libreswan. He worked with the Electronic Frontier Foundation, and human rights groups in Guatemala. He worked on Project Xanadu, the first hypertext system and helped set up The WELL (The Whole Earth 'Lectronic Link) virtual community. Mr. Daniel was associated with groups responsible for the optical character recognition processing of the PGP5 source code at the HIP'97 con, a Quadrennial Dutch hacker convention that took place from August 8 until August 10, 1997, at the campsite Kotterbos in Almere, Netherlands. His other contributions to the field include work on the original Apple Laserwriter. He worked with John Gilmore’s company Grasshopper Group in San Francisco, California, porting Sun Microsystems' NeWS windowing system to A/UX (Apple Unix).

== Interest in spaceflight ==
Daniel's spent time at the Lick Observatory and was influenced early on by Star Trek, having a love of space. His final resting place was onboard a memorial spaceflight.

Daniel's interest in spaceflight led him to work for Starstruck, which built three rockets and successfully launched one sub-orbitally.

His interest in space also lead to long discussions with Landon Curt Noll about Pluto research. Noll's efforts managed to save the budget of the monitoring of Pioneer and Voyager probes, as well as the New Horizon's probe past Pluto. In thanks, Noll was allowed to write some bytes in the "filler" part of the PROM of New Horizon, including Daniel's IRC handle: ||ugh.

== Death ==
Hugh Daniel died of heart failure at age 51. To honor his enthusiasm and contributions to space, a gram of his remains were launched into space on the Celestis Sunjammer flight, along with Gene and Majel Roddenberry, and James Doohan.
