= FreeS/WAN =

- Original author(s): John Gilmore (Founder)
- Final release: 2.06 / 22 April 2004
- Operating system: Linux
- Successor: strongSwan, Openswan, Libreswan
- Type: IPsec & IKE
- License: Mostly GNU GPL, see LICENSE file
- Website: freeswan.org

FreeS/WAN, for Free Secure Wide-Area Networking, was a free software project which implemented a reference version of the IPsec network security layer for Linux. The project goal of ubiquitous opportunistic encryption of Internet traffic was not realized, although it did contribute to general Internet encryption.

The project was founded by John Gilmore, and administered for most of its duration by Hugh Daniel. John Ioannidis and Angelos Keromytis started the codebase while outside the United States prior to autumn 1997. Technical lead for the project was Henry Spencer, and later Michael Richardson. The IKE keying daemon (pluto) was maintained by D. Hugh Redelmeier while the IPsec kernel module (KLIPS) was maintained by Richard Guy Briggs. Sandy Harris was the main documentation person for most of the project, later Claudia Schmeing.

The final FreeS/WAN version 2.06 was released on 22 April 2004. The earlier version 2.04 was forked to form two projects, Openswan and strongSwan. Openswan has since (2012) been forked to Libreswan.
