= Cookie exchange =

Cookie exchange may refer to:

- The exchange of HTTP cookies in the HTTP network protocol
- IPsec cookie exchange as part of the IPsec network protocol
