= Azure Sphere =

Linux-based microcontroller system

- Developer: Microsoft
- Written in: C and others
- OS family: Unix-like (Linux)
- Working state: Current
- Source model: At least partially open source
- General availability: February 24, 2020; 6 years ago
- Latest release: 23.05 / June 20, 2023; 3 years ago
- Latest preview: 19.10 / November 7, 2019; 6 years ago
- Repository: github.com/microsoft/azurelinux
- Supported platforms: ARM (MediaTek MT3620)
- Kernel type: Monolithic kernel
- License: Proprietary
- Official website: azure.microsoft.com/en-us/services/azure-sphere/

Azure Sphere is an application platform with integrated communications and security features developed and managed by Microsoft for Internet Connected Devices.

It combines a purpose-built system on a chip, the Azure Sphere operating system, and an Azure-based cloud environment for continuous monitoring.

== Azure Sphere OS ==
The Azure Sphere OS is a custom Linux-based microcontroller operating system created by Microsoft to run on an Azure Sphere-certified chip and to connect to the Azure Sphere Security Service. The Azure Sphere OS provides a platform for Internet of things application development, including both high-level applications and real-time-capable applications. It is the first operating system running a Linux kernel that Microsoft has publicly released and the second Unix-like operating system that the company has developed for external (public) users, the other being Xenix.

== Azure Sphere Security Service ==
The Azure Sphere Security Service, also known as AS3, is a cloud-based service that facilitates maintenance, updates, and control for Azure Sphere-certified chips. The Azure Sphere Security Service establishes a secure connection between devices and the internet or cloud services and ensures secure boot. The primary purpose of contact between an Azure Sphere device and the Azure Sphere Security Service is to authenticate the device identity, ensure the integrity and trust of the system software, and certify that the device is running a trusted code base. The service also provides a secure channel for Microsoft to automatically download and install Azure Sphere OS updates and customer application updates to deployed devices.

== Azure Sphere chips and hardware ==
Azure Sphere-certified chips and hardware support two general implementation categories: greenfield and brownfield. Greenfield implementation involves designing and building new IoT devices with an Azure Sphere-certified chip. Azure Sphere-certified chips are currently produced by MediaTek. In June 2019, NXP announced plans to produce a line of Azure Sphere-certified chips. In October 2019, Qualcomm announced plans to produce the first Azure Sphere-certified chips with cellular capabilities. Brownfield implementation involves the use of an Azure Sphere guardian device to securely connect an existing device to the internet. Azure Sphere guardian modules are currently produced by Avnet.

== Microsoft Pluton ==
Pluton is a Microsoft-designed security subsystem that implements a hardware-based root of trust for Azure Sphere. It includes a security processor core, cryptographic engines, a hardware random number generator, public/private key generation, asymmetric and symmetric encryption, support for elliptic curve digital signature algorithm (ECDSA) verification for secured boot, and measured boot in silicon to support remote attestation with a cloud service, and various tampering counter-measures.

== See also ==
- Intel Management Engine
- Next-Generation Secure Computing Base
- Trusted Computing
- Trusted Platform Module
- Windows Subsystem for Linux
- Xenix
- Windows IoT
