= Obfuscated TCP =

Obsolete TCP extension

Obfuscated TCP (ObsTCP) was a proposal for a transport layer protocol which implements opportunistic encryption over Transmission Control Protocol (TCP). It was designed to prevent mass wiretapping and malicious corruption of TCP traffic on the Internet, with lower implementation cost and complexity than Transport Layer Security (TLS). In August 2008, IETF rejected the proposal for a TCP option, suggesting it be done on the application layer instead. The project has been inactive since a few months later.

In 2010 June, a separate proposal called tcpcrypt has been submitted, which shares many of the goals of ObsTCP: being transparent to applications, opportunistic and low overhead. It requires even less configuration (no DNS entries or HTTP headers). Unlike ObsTCP, tcpcrypt also provides primitives down to the application to implement authentication and prevent man-in-the-middle attacks (MITM).

== Historical origin ==
ObsTCP was created by Adam Langley. The concept of obfuscating TCP communications using opportunistic encryption evolved through several iterations. The experimental iterations of ObsTCP used TCP options in 'SYN' packets to advertise support for ObsTCP, the server responding with a public key in the 'SYNACK'. An IETF draft protocol was first published in July 2008. Packets were encrypted with Salsa20/8, and signed packets with MD5 checksums.

The present (third) iteration uses special DNS records (or out of band methods) to advertise support and keys, without modifying the operation of the underlying TCP protocol.

== Encryption features ==
ObsTCP is a low cost protocol intended to protect TCP traffic, without requiring public key certificates, the services of Certificate Authorities, or a complex Public Key Infrastructure. It is intended to suppress the use of undirected surveillance to trawl unencrypted traffic, rather than protect against man in the middle attack.

The software presently supports the Salsa20/8 stream cipher and Curve25519 elliptic-curve Diffie Hellman function.

== Comparison with TLS/SSL/HTTPS ==
Feature	ObsTCP	SSL/TLS/HTTPS
Public Key Infrastructure	Does not require a signed public key certificate	Requires that a signed public key certificate is purchased (or self-signed certificate is used)
Web browser support	Patched versions of Firefox available	Widely supported by all popular web browsers
Web server support	Requires patches/server upgrades for lighttpd and Apache	Widely supported by popular web servers
Network latency	Nil additional round trips per connection (though DNS lookup may be required to obtain key advertisement)	One or two additional round trips per connection
Encryption speed	Very fast cryptography	Slower
TCP port	Can use any TCP port	Typically uses port 443, but can use any TCP port
Security characteristics	Does not resist some man-in-the-middle attacks	Resists man-in-the-middle attacks

== Connection establishment ==
A server using ObsTCP advertises a public key and a port number.

A DNS 'A record' may be used to advertise server support for ObsTCP (with a DNS 'CNAME record' providing a 'friendly' name). HTTP header records, or cached/out of band keyset information may also be used instead.

A client connecting to an ObsTCP server parses the DNS entries, uses HTTP header records, or uses cached/out of band data to obtain the public key and port number, before connecting to the server and encrypting traffic.

== See also ==
- Opportunistic encryption
- tcpcrypt (a newer proposal with similar goals)
- Transport Layer Security (TLS, also known as SSL)
- IPsec
