= John Gilmore (activist) =

American activist (born 1955)

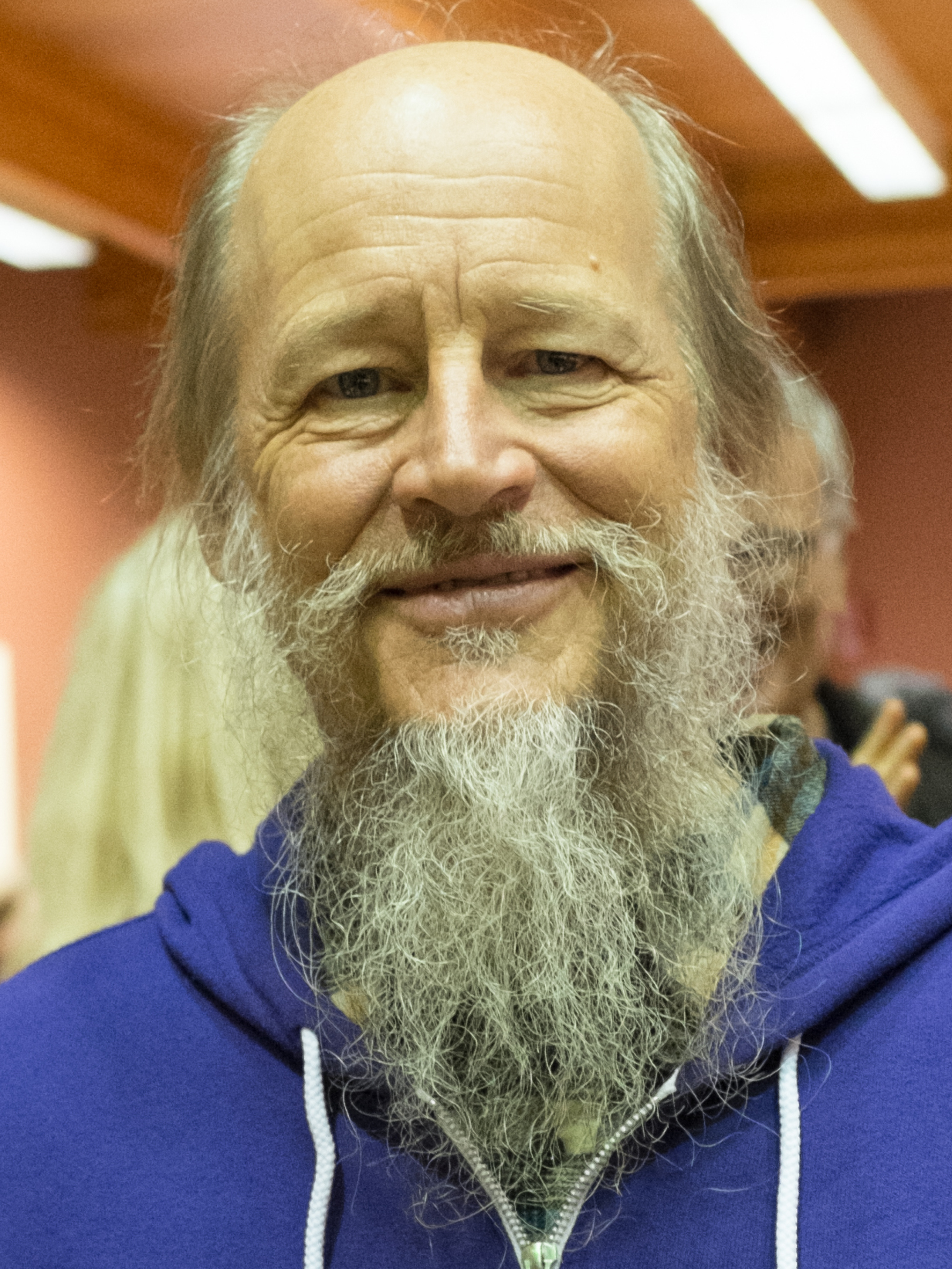
- Gilmore in 2018
- Born: 1955 (age 70–71); York, Pennsylvania, U.S.
- Known for: Co-Founder of the EFF

John Gilmore (born 1955) is an American activist. He is one of the founders of the Electronic Frontier Foundation, the Cypherpunks mailing list, and Cygnus Solutions. He created the alt.* hierarchy in Usenet and is a major contributor to the GNU Project.

An outspoken civil libertarian, Gilmore has sued the Federal Aviation Administration, the United States Department of Justice, and others. He was the plaintiff in the prominent case Gilmore v. Gonzales, challenging secret travel-restriction laws, which he lost. He is an advocate for drug policy reform.

He co-authored the Bootstrap Protocol in 1985, which evolved into Dynamic Host Configuration Protocol (DHCP), the primary way local networks assign an IP address to devices.

== Life and career ==
As the fifth employee of Sun Microsystems and founder of Cygnus Support, he became wealthy enough to retire early and pursue other interests. He is also one of the founders of the Electronic Frontier Foundation based in San Francisco.

He is a frequent contributor to free software, and worked on several GNU projects, including maintaining the GNU Debugger in the early 1990s, initiating GNU Radio in 1998, starting Gnash media player in December 2005 to create a free software player for Flash movies, and writing the pdtar program which became GNU tar. Outside of the GNU project he founded the FreeS/WAN project, an implementation of IPsec, to promote the encryption of Internet traffic. He sponsored the EFF's Deep Crack DES cracker, sponsored the Micropolis city building game based on SimCity, and is a proponent of opportunistic encryption.

Gilmore co-authored the Bootstrap Protocol with Bill Croft in 1985. The Bootstrap Protocol evolved into DHCP, the method by which Ethernet and wireless networks typically assign devices an IP address.

On October 22, 2021, the EFF announced that they had removed Gilmore from the Board following a governance dispute. The details of the dispute were not made public.

On June 23, 2024, Gilmore was selected as a board member of the Free Software Foundation.

== Activism ==
Gilmore owns the domain name toad.com, which is one of the 100 oldest active .com domains. It was registered on August 18, 1987. He runs the mail server at toad.com as an open mail relay. In October 2002, Gilmore's ISP, Verio, cut off his Internet access for running an open relay, a violation of Verio's terms of service. Many people contend that open relays make it too easy to send spam. Gilmore protests that Verio's actions constitute censorship, and he argues that his mail server was programmed to be essentially useless to spammers and other senders of mass email. He also notes that his configuration makes it easier for friends who travel to send email, although his critics counter that there are other mechanisms to accommodate people wanting to send email while traveling. The measures Gilmore took to make his server useless to spammers may or may not have helped, considering that in 2002, at least one mass-mailing worm that propagated through open relays — W32.Yaha — had been hard-coded to relay through the toad.com mail server.

Gilmore famously stated of Internet censorship that "The Net interprets censorship as damage and routes around it".

He unsuccessfully challenged the constitutionality of secret regulations regarding travel security policies in Gilmore v. Gonzales.

Gilmore is also an advocate for the relaxing of drug laws and has given financial support to Students for Sensible Drug Policy, the Marijuana Policy Project, Erowid, MAPS, Flex Your Rights, and various other organizations seeking to end the war on drugs. He is a member of the boards of directors of MAPS and the Marijuana Policy Project. Until October 2021, he was also a board member of the EFF.

== Affiliations ==
Following the sale of AMPRNet address space in mid-2019, Gilmore, under amateur radio call sign W0GNU, was listed as a board member of Amateur Radio Digital Communications, a non-profit involved in the management of the 44.0.0.0/8 resources on behalf of the amateur radio community.

== Honours ==
Gilmore has received the Free Software Foundation's Advancement of Free Software 2009 award.
