= Opportunistic TLS =

Communications protocol security extension

Opportunistic TLS (Transport Layer Security) refers to extensions in plain text communication protocols, which offer a way to upgrade a plain text connection to an encrypted (TLS or SSL) connection instead of using a separate port for encrypted communication. Several protocols use a command named "STARTTLS" or "Explicit TLS" for this purpose. It is a form of opportunistic encryption and is primarily intended as a countermeasure to passive monitoring.

The STARTTLS command for IMAP and POP3 is defined in RFC 2595, for SMTP in RFC 3207, for XMPP in RFC 6120 and for NNTP in RFC 4642. For IRC, the IRCv3 Working Group defined a STARTTLS extension, though it was later deprecated. FTP uses the command "AUTH TLS" defined in RFC 4217 and LDAP defines a protocol extension OID in RFC 2830. HTTP uses an upgrade header.

== Layering ==
TLS is application-neutral; in the words of RFC 5246:

One advantage of TLS is that it is application protocol independent. Higher-level protocols can layer on top of the TLS protocol transparently. The TLS standard, however, does not specify how protocols add security with TLS; the decisions on how to initiate TLS handshaking and how to interpret the authentication certificates exchanged are left to the judgment of the designers and implementors of protocols that run on top of TLS.

The style used to specify how to use TLS matches the same layer distinction that is also conveniently supported by several library implementations of TLS. E.g., the RFC 3207 SMTP extension illustrates with the following dialog how a client and server can start a secure session:

  S: <waits for connection on TCP port 25>
  C: <opens connection>
  S: 220 mail.example.org ESMTP service ready
  C: EHLO client.example.org
  S: 250-mail.example.org offers a warm hug of welcome
  S: 250 STARTTLS
  C: STARTTLS
  S: 220 Go ahead
  C: <starts TLS negotiation>
  C & S: <negotiate a TLS session>
  C & S: <check result of negotiation>
  C: EHLO client.example.org[4]
  . . .

The last EHLO command above is issued over a secure channel. Note that authentication is optional in SMTP, and the omitted server reply may now safely advertise an AUTH PLAIN SMTP extension, which is not present in the plain-text reply.

== SSL ports ==
Besides the use of opportunistic TLS, a number of TCP ports were defined for SSL-secured versions of well-known protocols. These establish secure communications and then present a communication stream identical to the old un-encrypted protocol. Separate SSL ports have the advantage of fewer round-trips; also less meta-data is transmitted in unencrypted form. Some examples include:

Protocol	Purpose	Normal port	SSL variant	SSL port
SMTP	Send email	25/587	SMTPS	465
POP3	Retrieve email	110	POP3S	995
IMAP	Read email	143	IMAPS	993
NNTP	News reader	119/433	NNTPS	563
LDAP	Directory Access	389	LDAPS	636
FTP	File transfer	21	FTPS	990
XMPP	Instant messaging	5222		5223

At least for the email related protocols, RFC 8314 favors Implicit TLS (using separate SSL ports) instead of STARTTLS.

== Weaknesses and mitigations ==
Opportunistic TLS is an opportunistic encryption mechanism. Because the initial handshake takes place in plain text, an attacker in control of the network can modify the server messages via a man-in-the-middle attack to make it appear that TLS is unavailable (called a STRIPTLS attack). Most SMTP clients will then send the email and possibly passwords in plain text, often with no notification to the user. In particular, many SMTP connections occur between mail servers, where user notification is not practical.

In September 2014, two ISPs in Thailand were found to be doing this to their own customers. In October 2014, Cricket Wireless, a subsidiary of AT&T, was revealed to be doing this to their customers. This behavior started as early as September 2013 by Aio Wireless, who later merged with Cricket where the practice continued.

STRIPTLS attacks can be blocked by configuring SMTP clients to require TLS for outgoing connections (for example, the Exim Message transfer agent can require TLS via the directive "hosts_require_tls"). However, since not every mail server supports TLS, it is not practical to simply require TLS for all connections.

An example of a STRIPTLS attack of the type used in Thai mass surveillance technology:

   220 smtp.gmail.com ESMTP mail.redacted.com - gsmtp
   ehlo a
   250-smtp.gmail.com at your service, [REDACTED SERVICE]
   250-SIZE 35882577
   250-8BITMIME
   # The STARTTLS command is stripped here
   250-ENHANCEDSTATUSCODES
   250-PIPELINING
   250 SMTPUTF8

   220 smtp.gmail.com ESMTP - gsmtp
   ehlo a
   250-smtp.gmail.com at your service
   250-SIZE 35882577
   250-8BITMIME
   250-STARTTLS
   250-ENHANCEDSTATUSCODES
   250-PIPELINING
   250 SMTPUTF8

Supposing the client side supports it (name resolution of the client and upstream DNS server of the client), this problem can be addressed by DNS-based Authentication of Named Entities (DANE), a part of DNSSEC, and in particular by RFC 7672 for SMTP. DANE allows to advertise support for secure SMTP via a TLSA record. This tells connecting clients they should require TLS, thus preventing STRIPTLS attacks. The STARTTLS Everywhere project from the Electronic Frontier Foundation works in a similar way. However, DNSSEC, due to deployment complexities and peculiar criticism, faced a low adoption rate and a new protocol called SMTP MTA Strict Transport Security or MTA-STS has been drafted by a group of major email service providers including Microsoft, Google and Yahoo. MTA-STS does not require the use of DNSSEC to authenticate DANE TLSA records but relies on the certificate authority (CA) system and a trust-on-first-use (TOFU) approach to avoid interceptions. The TOFU model reduces complexity but without the guarantees on first use offered by DNSSEC. In addition, MTA-STS introduces a mechanism for failure reporting and a report-only mode, enabling progressive roll-out and auditing for compliance.

== Popularity ==
Following the revelations made by Edward Snowden in light of the global mass surveillance scandal, popular email providers have bettered their email security by enabling STARTTLS. Facebook reported that after enabling STARTTLS and encouraging other providers to do the same, until Facebook discontinued its email service in February 2014, 95% of outbound email was encrypted with both perfect forward secrecy and strict certificate validation.
