= Gilmore v. Gonzales =

- Court: United States Court of Appeals for the Ninth Circuit
- Full case name: Gilmore v. Gonzales
- Argued: December 8 2005
- Decided: January 26 2006
- Citation: 04-15736

Case history
- Prior history: U.S. District Court for the Northern District of California
- Subsequent history: U.S. Supreme Court

Holding
- That neither the identification policy nor its application to Gilmore violated Gilmore's constitutional rights

Court membership
- Judges sitting: Associate Judge: Richard A. Paez; Senior Judges: Stephen S. Trott, Thomas G. Nelson

Case opinions
- Majority: Paez, joined by Trott, Nelson

Laws applied
- —

Gilmore v. Gonzales, 435 F.3d 1125 (9th Cir. 2006), was a lawsuit filed by John Gilmore against various United States executive and independent agencies and departments, and against United Airlines. Gilmore claimed that being required to show identification in order to travel by plane inside the country is an unconstitutional restriction of his rights to travel, to petition government, and to speak anonymously. Gilmore also complained about being subject to "secret law", when the airlines and government refused to show the directive under which they were requesting ID.

The district court and Ninth Circuit Court of Appeals sided against Gilmore, holding there was no constitutional violation because air passengers could still travel without identification if they instead underwent the more stringent "secondary screening" search. While the court saw the Security Directive in camera, the public still has not been permitted to see the text.

Gilmore petitioned for certiorari to the U.S. Supreme Court, but in January 2007 the court declined to hear the case. As a result, the case is precedent for the Court of Appeals for the Ninth Circuit.

== See also ==
- Alberto Gonzales
