= Information security =

Protecting information by mitigating risk

Information security (infosec) is the practice of protecting information by mitigating information risks. It is part of information risk management. It typically involves preventing or reducing the probability of unauthorized or inappropriate access to data or the unlawful use, disclosure, disruption, deletion, corruption, modification, inspection, recording, or devaluation of information. It also involves actions intended to reduce the adverse impacts of such incidents. Protected information may take any form, e.g., electronic or physical, tangible (e.g., paperwork), or intangible (e.g., knowledge). Information security's primary focus is the balanced protection of data confidentiality, integrity, and availability (known as the CIA triad, unrelated to the US government organization) while maintaining a focus on efficient policy implementation but without hampering organization productivity. This is largely achieved through a structured risk management process.

To standardize this discipline, academics and professionals collaborate to offer guidance, policies, and industry standards on passwords, antivirus software, firewalls, encryption software, legal liability, security awareness and training, and so forth. This standardization may be further driven by a wide variety of laws and regulations that affect how data is accessed, processed, stored, transferred, and destroyed.

While paper-based business operations are still prevalent, requiring their own set of information security practices, enterprise digital initiatives are increasingly being emphasized, with information assurance dealt with by information technology (IT) security specialists. These specialists apply information security to technology (most often some form of computer system).

IT security specialists are hired by major enterprises and establishments to keep company technology secure from malicious attacks seeking to acquire critical private information or gain control of the internal systems.

There are many specialized roles in Information Security including securing networks and allied infrastructure, securing applications and databases, security testing, information systems auditing, business continuity planning, electronic record discovery, and digital forensics.

== Standards ==
Information security standards are guidelines generally outlined in published materials that aim to protect a user's or an organization's cyber environment from threats. This environment includes the users themselves, hardware such as devices and networks, software such as applications or services, and any information in storage or transit.

These standards comprise security concepts, technologies, and guidelines to deal with an adverse event. They may also include assessment criteria and certification for organizations implementing a minimum level of security. These standards are developed by various international and national bodies to prevent or mitigate cyber-attacks, ensure consistency among developers, and establish a minimum standard in industries susceptible to an attack.

The ISO/IEC 27000 family, published by the International Organization for Standardization (ISO) and the International Electrotechnical Commission (IEC), provides information about the guidelines and requirements for an Information Security Management System (ISMS). The Common Criteria (ISO/IEC 15408) provides guidelines on evaluating and certifying the security of a system. The IEC 62443 establishes security standards for automation and control systems. Similarly, the ISO/SAE 21434, ETSI EN 303 645, and EN 18031 provide standards for road vehicles, the Internet of Things, and radio-based systems respectively.

The NIST Cybersecurity Framework (NIST CSF) is a set of guidelines developed by the U.S. National Institute of Standards and Technology to help organizations with risk management. NIST also publishes various Federal Information Processing Standards (FIPS) and Special Publications. The United Kingdom has introduced Cyber Essentials, which is a certification scheme to protect organizations against common security threats. The Australian Cyber Security Centre publishes the Essential Eight mitigation strategies.

The Payment Card Industry Data Security Standard (PCI DSS) regulates handling of cardholder data in order to reduce credit card fraud. UL has published standards related to specific industries such as UL 2900-2-3 for security and life safety signaling systems and UL-2900-2-1 for healthcare and wellness systems.

== Threats ==
Information security threats come in many different forms. Some of the most common threats today are software attacks, theft of intellectual property, theft of identity, theft of equipment or information, sabotage, and information extortion. Viruses, worms, phishing attacks, and Trojan horses are a few common examples of software attacks. The theft of intellectual property has also been an extensive issue for many businesses. Identity theft is the attempt to act as someone else usually to obtain that person's personal information or to take advantage of their access to vital information through social engineering. Sabotage usually consists of the destruction of an organization's website in an attempt to cause loss of confidence on the part of its customers. Information extortion consists of theft of a company's property or information as an attempt to receive a payment in exchange for returning the information or property back to its owner, as with ransomware. One of the most functional precautions against these attacks is to conduct periodical user awareness.

Governments, military, corporations, financial institutions, hospitals, non-profit organizations, and private businesses amass a great deal of confidential information about their employees, customers, products, research, and financial status. Should confidential information about a business's customers or finances or new product line fall into the hands of a competitor or hacker, a business and its customers could suffer widespread, irreparable financial loss, as well as damage to the company's reputation. From a business perspective, information security must be balanced against cost; the Gordon-Loeb Model provides a mathematical economic approach for addressing this concern.

For the individual, information security has a significant effect on privacy, which is viewed very differently in various cultures.

== History ==
Since the early days of communication, diplomats and military commanders understood that it was necessary to provide some mechanism to protect the confidentiality of correspondence and to have some means of detecting tampering. Julius Caesar is credited with the invention of the Caesar cipher c. 50 B.C., which was created in order to prevent his secret messages from being read should a message fall into the wrong hands. However, for the most part protection was achieved through the application of procedural handling controls. Sensitive information was marked up to indicate that it should be protected and transported by trusted persons, guarded and stored in a secure environment or strong box. As postal services expanded, governments created official organizations to intercept, decipher, read, and reseal letters (e.g., the U.K.'s Secret Office, founded in 1653).

In the mid-nineteenth century more complex classification systems were developed to allow governments to manage their information according to the degree of sensitivity. For example, the British Government codified this, to some extent, with the publication of the Official Secrets Act in 1889. Section 1 of the law concerned espionage and unlawful disclosures of information, while Section 2 dealt with breaches of official trust. A public interest defense was soon added to defend disclosures in the interest of the state. A similar law was passed in India in 1889, The Indian Official Secrets Act, which was associated with the British colonial era and used to crack down on newspapers that opposed the Raj's policies. A newer version was passed in 1923 that extended to all matters of confidential or secret information for governance. By the time of the First World War, multi-tier classification systems were used to communicate information to and from various fronts, which encouraged greater use of code making and breaking sections in diplomatic and military headquarters. Encoding became more sophisticated between the wars as machines were employed to scramble and unscramble information.

The establishment of computer security inaugurated the history of information security. The need for such appeared during World War II. The volume of information shared by the Allied countries during the Second World War necessitated formal alignment of classification systems and procedural controls. An arcane range of markings evolved to indicate who could handle documents (usually officers rather than enlisted troops) and where they should be stored as increasingly complex safes and storage facilities were developed. The Enigma Machine, which was employed by the Germans to encrypt the data of warfare and was successfully decrypted by Alan Turing, can be regarded as a striking example of creating and using secured information. Procedures evolved to ensure documents were destroyed properly, and it was the failure to follow these procedures which led to some of the greatest intelligence coups of the war (e.g., the capture of U-570).

Various mainframe computers were connected online during the Cold War to complete more sophisticated tasks, in a communication process easier than mailing magnetic tapes back and forth by computer centers. As such, the Advanced Research Projects Agency (ARPA), of the United States Department of Defense, started researching the feasibility of a networked system of communication to trade information within the United States Armed Forces. In 1968, the ARPANET project was formulated by Larry Roberts, which would later evolve into what is known as the internet.

In 1973, important elements of ARPANET security were found by internet pioneer Robert Metcalfe to have many flaws such as the: "vulnerability of password structure and formats; lack of safety procedures for dial-up connections; and nonexistent user identification and authorizations", aside from the lack of controls and safeguards to keep data safe from unauthorized access. Hackers had effortless access to ARPANET, as phone numbers were known by the public. Due to these problems, coupled with the constant violation of computer security, as well as the exponential increase in the number of hosts and users of the system, "network security" was often alluded to as "network insecurity".

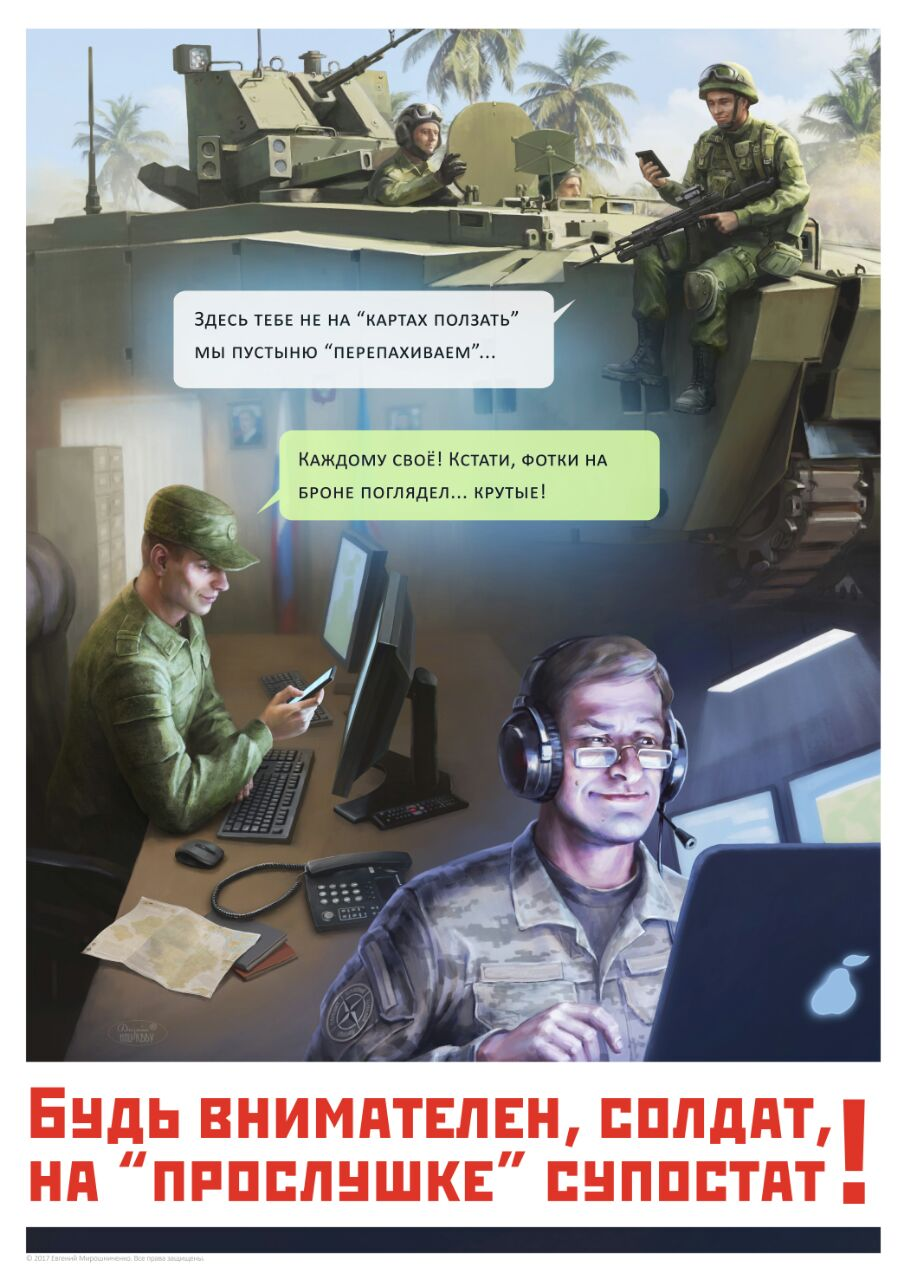
Poster promoting information security by the Russian Ministry of Defence

The end of the twentieth century and the early years of the twenty-first century saw rapid advancements in telecommunications, computing hardware and software, and data encryption. The availability of smaller, more powerful, and less expensive computing equipment made electronic data processing within the reach of small business and home users. The establishment of Transfer Control Protocol/Internetwork Protocol (TCP/IP) in the early 1980s enabled different types of computers to communicate. These computers quickly became interconnected through the internet.

The rapid growth and widespread use of electronic data processing and electronic business conducted through the internet, along with numerous occurrences of international terrorism, fueled the need for better methods of protecting the computers and the information they store, process, and transmit. The academic disciplines of computer security and information assurance emerged along with numerous professional organizations, all sharing the common goals of ensuring the security and reliability of information systems.

== Security Goals ==
The "CIA triad" of confidentiality, integrity, and availability is at the heart of information security. The concept was introduced in the Anderson Report in 1972 and later repeated in The Protection of Information in Computer Systems. The abbreviation was coined by Steve Lipner around 1986.

In information security, confidentiality "is the property, that information is not made available or disclosed to unauthorized individuals, entities, or processes." While similar to "privacy", the two words are not interchangeable. Rather, confidentiality is a component of privacy that is implemented to protect data from unauthorized viewers. Examples of confidentiality of electronic data being compromised include laptop theft, password theft, or sensitive emails being sent to the incorrect individuals.

In IT security, data integrity means maintaining and assuring the accuracy and completeness of data. This means that data cannot be modified in an unauthorized or undetected manner. More broadly, integrity is an information security principle that involves human/social, process, and commercial integrity, as well as data integrity. As such it touches on aspects such as credibility, consistency, truthfulness, completeness, accuracy, timeliness, and assurance.

For any information system to serve its purpose, the information must be available when it is needed. This means the computing systems used to store and process the information, the security controls used to protect it, and the communication channels used to access it must be functioning correctly. Ensuring availability may also involve preventing denial-of-service attacks, such as a flood of incoming messages to the target system, essentially forcing it to shut down.

In addition to the classic CIA triad of security goals, some organisations may want to include security goals such as authenticity, accountability, non-repudiation, and reliability. The merits of the Parkerian Hexad are a subject of debate amongst security professionals.

== Risk management ==
Risk is the likelihood that something bad will happen that causes harm to an informational asset (or the loss of the asset). A vulnerability is a weakness that could be used to endanger or cause harm to an informational asset. A threat is anything (man-made or act of nature) that has the potential to cause harm. The likelihood that a threat will use a vulnerability to cause harm creates a risk. When a threat does use a vulnerability to inflict harm, it has an impact. In the context of information security, the impact is a loss of availability, integrity, and confidentiality, and possibly other losses (lost income, loss of life, loss of real property).

The Certified Information Systems Auditor (CISA) Review Manual 2006 defines risk management as "the process of identifying vulnerabilities and threats to the information resources used by an organization in achieving business objectives, and deciding what countermeasures, if any, to take in reducing risk to an acceptable level, based on the value of the information resource to the organization."

There are two things in this definition that may need some clarification. First, the process of risk management is an ongoing, iterative process. It must be repeated indefinitely. The business environment is constantly changing and new threats and vulnerabilities emerge every day. Second, the choice of countermeasures (controls) used to manage risks must strike a balance between productivity, cost, effectiveness of the countermeasure, and the value of the informational asset being protected. Furthermore, these processes have limitations as security breaches are generally rare and emerge in a specific context which may not be easily duplicated. Thus, any process and countermeasure should itself be evaluated for vulnerabilities. It is not possible to identify all risks, nor is it possible to eliminate all risk. The remaining risk is called "residual risk".

A risk assessment is carried out by a team of people who have knowledge of specific areas of the business. Membership of the team may vary over time as different parts of the business are assessed. The assessment may use a subjective qualitative analysis based on informed opinion, or where reliable dollar figures and historical information is available, the analysis may use quantitative analysis.

Research has shown that the most vulnerable point in most information systems is the human user, operator, designer, or other human. The ISO/IEC 27002:2005 Code of practice for information security management recommends the following be examined during a risk assessment:

- security policy,
- organization of information security,
- asset management,
- human resources security,
- physical and environmental security,
- communications and operations management,
- access control,
- information systems acquisition, development, and maintenance,
- information security incident management,
- business continuity management
- regulatory compliance.

In broad terms, the risk management process consists of:

1. Identification of assets and estimating their value. Include: people, buildings, hardware, software, data (electronic, print, other), supplies.
2. Conduct a threat assessment. Include: Acts of nature, acts of war, accidents, malicious acts originating from inside or outside the organization.
3. Conduct a vulnerability assessment, and for each vulnerability, calculate the probability that it will be exploited. Evaluate policies, procedures, standards, training, physical security, quality control, technical security.
4. Calculate the impact that each threat would have on each asset. Use qualitative analysis or quantitative analysis.
5. Identify, select and implement appropriate controls. Provide a proportional response. Consider productivity, cost effectiveness, and value of the asset.
6. Evaluate the effectiveness of the control measures. Ensure the controls provide the required cost effective protection without discernible loss of productivity.

For any given risk, management can choose to accept the risk based upon the relative low value of the asset, the relative low frequency of occurrence, and the relative low impact on the business. Or, leadership may choose to mitigate the risk by selecting and implementing appropriate control measures to reduce the risk. In some cases, the risk can be transferred to another business by buying insurance or outsourcing to another business. The reality of some risks may be disputed. In such cases leadership may choose to deny the risk.

=== Security controls ===
Selecting and implementing proper security controls will initially help an organization bring down risk to acceptable levels. Control selection should follow and should be based on the risk assessment. Controls can vary in nature, but fundamentally they are ways of protecting the confidentiality, integrity or availability of information. ISO/IEC 27001 has defined controls in different areas. Organizations can implement additional controls according to requirement of the organization. ISO/IEC 27002 offers a guideline for organizational information security standards.

== Defense in depth ==
The onion model of defense in depth

Defense in depth is a fundamental security philosophy that relies on overlapping security systems designed to maintain protection even if individual components fail. Rather than depending on a single security measure, it combines multiple layers of security controls both in the cloud and at network endpoints. This approach includes combinations like firewalls with intrusion-detection systems, email filtering services with desktop anti-virus, and cloud-based security alongside traditional network defenses. The concept can be implemented through three distinct layers of administrative, logical, and physical controls, or visualized as an onion model with data at the core, surrounded by people, network security, host-based security, and application security layers. The strategy emphasizes that security involves not just technology, but also people and processes working together, with real-time monitoring and response being crucial components.

== Classification ==
An important aspect of information security and risk management is recognizing the value of information and defining appropriate procedures and protection requirements for the information. Not all information is equal and so not all information requires the same degree of protection. This requires information to be assigned a security classification. The first step in information classification is to identify a member of senior management as the owner of the particular information to be classified. Next, develop a classification policy. The policy should describe the different classification labels, define the criteria for information to be assigned a particular label, and list the required security controls for each classification.

Some factors that influence which classification information should be assigned include how much value that information has to the organization, how old the information is and whether or not the information has become obsolete. Laws and other regulatory requirements are also important considerations when classifying information. The Information Systems Audit and Control Association (ISACA) and its Business Model for Information Security also serves as a tool for security professionals to examine security from a systems perspective, creating an environment where security can be managed holistically, allowing actual risks to be addressed.

The type of information security classification labels selected and used will depend on the nature of the organization, with examples being:

- In the business sector, labels such as: Public, Sensitive, Private, Confidential.
- In the government sector, labels such as: Unclassified, Unofficial, Protected, Confidential, Secret, Top Secret, and their non-English equivalents.
- In cross-sectoral formations, the Traffic Light Protocol, which consists of: White, Green, Amber, and Red.
- In the personal sector, one label such as Financial. This includes activities related to managing money, such as online banking.

All employees in the organization, as well as business partners, must be trained on the classification schema and understand the required security controls and handling procedures for each classification. The classification of a particular information asset that has been assigned should be reviewed periodically to ensure the classification is still appropriate for the information and to ensure the security controls required by the classification are in place and are followed in their right procedures.

== Access control ==
Access to protected information must be restricted to people who are authorized to access the information. The computer programs, and in many cases the computers that process the information, must also be authorized. This requires that mechanisms be in place to control the access to protected information. The sophistication of the access control mechanisms should be in parity with the value of the information being protected; the more sensitive or valuable the information the stronger the control mechanisms need to be. The foundation on which access control mechanisms are built start with identification and authentication.

Access control is generally considered in three steps: identification, authentication, and authorization.

=== Identification ===
Identification is an assertion of who someone is or what something is. If a person makes the statement "Hello, my name is John Doe" they are making a claim of who they are. However, their claim may or may not be true. Before John Doe can be granted access to protected information it will be necessary to verify that the person claiming to be John Doe really is John Doe. Typically the claim is in the form of a username. By entering that username, John Doe is claiming that they are the person to whom the username belongs.

=== Authentication ===
Authentication is the act of verifying a claim of identity. When John Doe goes into a bank to make a withdrawal, he tells the bank teller he is John Doe, a claim of identity. The bank teller asks to see a photo ID, so he hands the teller his driver's license. The bank teller checks the license to make sure it has John Doe printed on it and compares the photograph on the license against the person claiming to be John Doe. If the photo and name match the person, then the teller has authenticated that John Doe is who he claimed to be. Similarly, by entering the correct password, the user is providing evidence that they are the person the username belongs to.

There are three different types of information that can be used for authentication:

- Something one knows: things such as a PIN, a password, or one's mother's maiden name
- Something one has: a driver's license or a magnetic swipe card
- Something one is: biometrics, including palm prints, fingerprints, voice prints, and retina (eye) scans

Strong authentication requires providing more than one type of authentication information (two-factor authentication). The username is the most common form of identification on computer systems today and the password is the most common form of authentication. Usernames and passwords have served their purpose, but they are increasingly inadequate. Usernames and passwords are slowly being replaced or supplemented with more sophisticated authentication mechanisms such as time-based one-time password algorithms.

=== Authorization ===
After a person, program or computer has successfully been identified and authenticated then it must be determined what informational resources they are permitted to access and what actions they will be allowed to perform (run, view, create, delete, or change). This is called authorization. Authorization to access information and other computing services begins with administrative policies and procedures. The policies prescribe what information and computing services can be accessed, by whom, and under what conditions. The access control mechanisms are then configured to enforce these policies. Different computing systems are equipped with different kinds of access control mechanisms. Some may even offer a choice of different access control mechanisms. The access control mechanism a system offers will be based upon one of three approaches to access control, or it may be derived from a combination of the three approaches.

The non-discretionary approach consolidates all access control under a centralized administration. The access to information and other resources is usually based on the individuals function (role) in the organization or the tasks the individual must perform. The discretionary approach gives the creator or owner of the information resource the ability to control access to those resources. In the mandatory access control approach, access is granted or denied basing upon the security classification assigned to the information resource.

Examples of common access control mechanisms in use today include role-based access control, available in many advanced database management systems; simple file permissions provided in the UNIX and Windows operating systems; Group Policy Objects provided in Windows network systems; and Kerberos, RADIUS, TACACS, and the simple access lists used in many firewalls and routers.

To be effective, policies and other security controls must be enforceable and upheld. Effective policies ensure that people are held accountable for their actions. The U.S. Treasury's guidelines for systems processing sensitive or proprietary information, for example, states that all failed and successful authentication and access attempts must be logged, and all access to information must leave some type of audit trail.

Also, the need-to-know principle needs to be in effect when talking about access control. This principle gives access rights to a person to perform their job functions. This principle is used in the government when dealing with difference clearances. Even though two employees in different departments have a top-secret clearance, they must have a need-to-know in order for information to be exchanged. Within the need-to-know principle, network administrators grant the employee the least amount of privilege to prevent employees from accessing more than what they are supposed to. Need-to-know helps to enforce the confidentiality-integrity-availability triad and directly impacts the confidential area of the triad.

== Cryptography ==
Information security uses cryptography to transform usable information into a form that renders it unusable by anyone other than an authorized user; this process is called encryption. Information that has been encrypted (rendered unusable) can be transformed back into its original usable form by an authorized user who possesses the cryptographic key, through the process of decryption. Cryptography is used in information security to protect information from unauthorized or accidental disclosure while the information is in transit (either electronically or physically) and while information is in storage.

Cryptography provides information security with other useful applications as well, including improved authentication methods, message digests, digital signatures, non-repudiation, and encrypted network communications. Older, less secure applications such as Telnet and File Transfer Protocol (FTP) are slowly being replaced with more secure applications such as Secure Shell (SSH) that use encrypted network communications. Wireless communications can be encrypted using protocols such as WPA/WPA2 or the older (and less secure) WEP. Wired communications (such as ITU‑T G.hn) are secured using AES for encryption and X.1035 for authentication and key exchange. Software applications such as GnuPG or PGP can be used to encrypt data files and email.

Cryptography can introduce security problems when it is not implemented correctly. Cryptographic solutions need to be implemented using industry-accepted solutions that have undergone rigorous peer review by independent experts in cryptography. The length and strength of the encryption key is also an important consideration. A key that is weak or too short will produce weak encryption. The keys used for encryption and decryption must be protected with the same degree of rigor as any other confidential information. They must be protected from unauthorized disclosure and destruction, and they must be available when needed. Public key infrastructure (PKI) solutions address many of the problems that surround key management.

== Process ==
U.S. Federal Sentencing Guidelines now make it possible to hold corporate officers liable for failing to exercise due care and due diligence in the management of their information systems.

In the field of information security, Harris offers the following definitions of due care and due diligence:

"Due care are steps that are taken to show that a company has taken responsibility for the activities that take place within the corporation and has taken the necessary steps to help protect the company, its resources, and employees." And, [Due diligence are the] "continual activities that make sure the protection mechanisms are continually maintained and operational."

Attention should be made to two important points in these definitions. First, in due care, steps are taken to show; this means that the steps can be verified, measured, or even produce tangible artifacts. Second, in due diligence, there are continual activities; this means that people are actually doing things to monitor and maintain the protection mechanisms, and these activities are ongoing.

Organizations have a responsibility with practicing duty of care when applying information security. The Duty of Care Risk Analysis Standard (DoCRA) provides principles and practices for evaluating risk. It considers all parties that could be affected by those risks. DoCRA helps evaluate safeguards if they are appropriate in protecting others from harm while presenting a reasonable burden. With increased data breach litigation, companies must balance security controls, compliance, and its mission.

=== Incident response plans ===
Computer security incident management is a specialized form of incident management focused on monitoring, detecting, and responding to security events on computers and networks in a predictable way.

Organizations implement this through incident response plans (IRPs) that are activated when security breaches are detected. These plans typically involve an incident response team (IRT) with specialized skills in areas like penetration testing, computer forensics, and network security.

=== Change management ===
Change management is a formal process for directing and controlling alterations to the information processing environment. This includes alterations to desktop computers, the network, servers, and software. The objectives of change management are to reduce the risks posed by changes to the information processing environment and improve the stability and reliability of the processing environment as changes are made. It is not the objective of change management to prevent or hinder necessary changes from being implemented.

Any change to the information processing environment introduces an element of risk. Even apparently simple changes can have unexpected effects. One of management's many responsibilities is the management of risk. Change management is a tool for managing the risks introduced by changes to the information processing environment. Part of the change management process ensures that changes are not implemented at inopportune times when they may disrupt critical business processes or interfere with other changes being implemented.

Not every change needs to be managed. Some kinds of changes are a part of the everyday routine of information processing and adhere to a predefined procedure, which reduces the overall level of risk to the processing environment. Creating a new user account or deploying a new desktop computer are examples of changes that do not generally require change management. However, relocating user file shares, or upgrading the Email server pose a much higher level of risk to the processing environment and are not a normal everyday activity. The critical first steps in change management are (a) defining change (and communicating that definition) and (b) defining the scope of the change system.

Change management is usually overseen by a change review board composed of representatives from key business areas, security, networking, systems administrators, database administration, application developers, desktop support, and the help desk. The tasks of the change review board can be facilitated with the use of automated work flow application. The responsibility of the change review board is to ensure the organization's documented change management procedures are followed. The change management process is as follows

- Request: Anyone can request a change. The person making the change request may or may not be the same person that performs the analysis or implements the change. When a request for change is received, it may undergo a preliminary review to determine if the requested change is compatible with the organizations business model and practices, and to determine the amount of resources needed to implement the change.
- Approve: Management runs the business and controls the allocation of resources therefore, management must approve requests for changes and assign a priority for every change. Management might choose to reject a change request if the change is not compatible with the business model, industry standards or best practices. Management might also choose to reject a change request if the change requires more resources than can be allocated for the change.
- Plan: Planning a change involves discovering the scope and impact of the proposed change; analyzing the complexity of the change; allocation of resources and, developing, testing, and documenting both implementation and back-out plans.
- Test: Every change must be tested in a safe test environment, which closely reflects the actual production environment, before the change is applied to the production environment. The backout plan must also be tested.
- Schedule: Part of the change review board's responsibility is to assist in the scheduling of changes by reviewing the proposed implementation date for potential conflicts with other scheduled changes or critical business activities.
- Communicate: Once a change has been scheduled it must be communicated. The communication is to give others the opportunity to remind the change review board about other changes or critical business activities that might have been overlooked when scheduling the change. The communication also serves to make the help desk and users aware that a change is about to occur. Another responsibility of the change review board is to ensure that scheduled changes have been properly communicated to those who will be affected by the change or otherwise have an interest in the change.
- Implement: At the appointed date and time, the changes must be implemented. Part of the planning process was to develop an implementation plan, testing plan and, a back out plan. If the implementation of the change should fail or, the post implementation testing fails or, other "drop dead" criteria have been met, the back out plan should be implemented.
- Document: All changes must be documented. The documentation includes the initial request for change, its approval, the priority assigned to it, the implementation, testing and back out plans, the results of the change review board critique, the date/time the change was implemented, who implemented it, and whether the change was implemented successfully, failed or postponed.
- Post-change review: The change review board should hold a post-implementation review of changes. It is particularly important to review failed and backed out changes. The review board should try to understand the problems that were encountered, and look for areas for improvement.

Change management procedures that are simple to follow and easy to use can greatly reduce the overall risks created when changes are made to the information processing environment. Good change management procedures improve the overall quality and success of changes as they are implemented. This is accomplished through planning, peer review, documentation, and communication.

== Business continuity ==
Business continuity management (BCM) concerns arrangements aiming to protect an organization's critical business functions from interruption due to incidents, or at least minimize the effects. BCM is essential to any organization to keep technology and business in line with current threats to the continuation of business as usual. The BCM should be included in an organizations risk analysis plan to ensure that all of the necessary business functions have what they need to keep going in the event of any type of threat to any business function.

It encompasses:

- Analysis of requirements, e.g., identifying critical business functions, dependencies and potential failure points, potential threats and hence incidents or risks of concern to the organization;
- Architecture and design, e.g., an appropriate combination of approaches including resilience (e.g. engineering IT systems and processes for high availability, avoiding or preventing situations that might interrupt the business), incident and emergency management (e.g., evacuating premises, calling the emergency services, triage/situation assessment and invoking recovery plans), recovery (e.g., rebuilding) and contingency management (generic capabilities to deal positively with whatever occurs using whatever resources are available);
- Implementation, e.g., configuring and scheduling backups, data transfers, etc., duplicating and strengthening critical elements; contracting with service and equipment suppliers;
- Testing, e.g., business continuity exercises of various types, costs and assurance levels;
- Management, e.g., defining strategies, setting objectives and goals; planning and directing the work; allocating funds, people and other resources; prioritization relative to other activities; team building, leadership, control, motivation and coordination with other business functions and activities (e.g., IT, facilities, human resources, risk management, information risk and security, operations); monitoring the situation, checking and updating the arrangements when things change; maturing the approach through continuous improvement, learning and appropriate investment;
- Assurance, e.g., testing against specified requirements; measuring, analyzing, and reporting key parameters; conducting additional tests, reviews and audits for greater confidence that the arrangements will go to plan if invoked.

Whereas BCM takes a broad approach to minimizing disaster-related risks by reducing both the probability and the severity of incidents, a disaster recovery plan (DRP) focuses specifically on resuming business operations as quickly as possible after a disaster. A disaster recovery plan, invoked soon after a disaster occurs, lays out the steps necessary to recover critical information and communications technology (ICT) infrastructure. Disaster recovery planning includes establishing a planning group, performing risk assessment, establishing priorities, developing recovery strategies, preparing inventories and documentation of the plan, developing verification criteria and procedure, and lastly implementing the plan.

== Laws and regulations ==
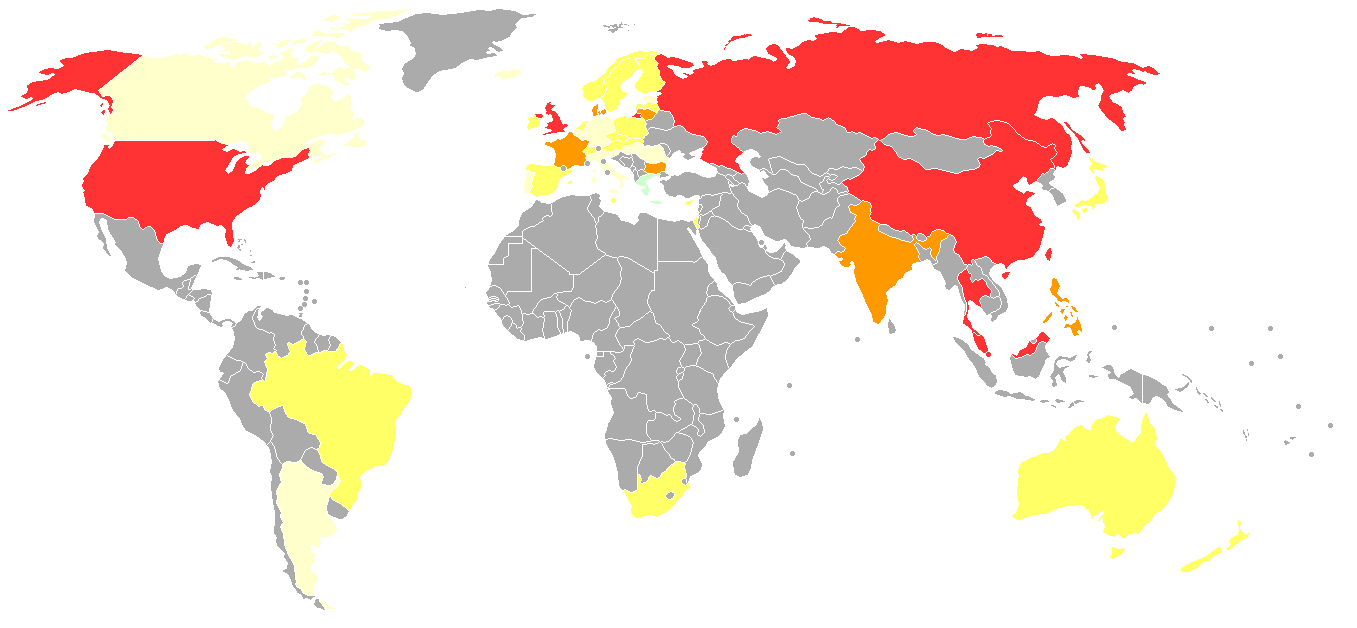
Privacy International 2007 privacy ranking green: Protections and safeguards red: Endemic surveillance societies

Below is a partial listing of governmental laws and regulations in various parts of the world that have, had, or will have, a significant effect on data processing and information security. Important industry sector regulations have also been included when they have a significant impact on information security.

- The UK Data Protection Act 1998 makes new provisions for the regulation of the processing of information relating to individuals, including the obtaining, holding, use or disclosure of such information. The European Union Data Protection Directive (EUDPD) requires that all E.U. members adopt national regulations to standardize the protection of data privacy for citizens throughout the E.U.
- The Computer Misuse Act 1990 is an Act of the U.K. Parliament making computer crime (e.g., hacking) a criminal offense. The act has become a model upon which several other countries, including Canada and Ireland, have drawn inspiration from when subsequently drafting their own information security laws.
- The E.U.'s Data Retention Directive (annulled) required internet service providers and phone companies to keep data on every electronic message sent and phone call made for between six months and two years.
- The Family Educational Rights and Privacy Act (FERPA) (20 U.S.C. § 1232 g; 34 CFR Part 99) is a U.S. Federal law that protects the privacy of student education records. The law applies to all schools that receive funds under an applicable program of the U.S. Department of Education. Generally, schools must have written permission from the parent or eligible student in order to release any information from a student's education record.
- The Federal Financial Institutions Examination Council's (FFIEC) security guidelines for auditors specifies requirements for online banking security.
- The Health Insurance Portability and Accountability Act (HIPAA) of 1996 requires the adoption of national standards for electronic health care transactions and national identifiers for providers, health insurance plans, and employers. Additionally, it requires health care providers, insurance providers and employers to safeguard the security and privacy of health data.
- The Gramm–Leach–Bliley Act of 1999 (GLBA), also known as the Financial Services Modernization Act of 1999, protects the privacy and security of private financial information that financial institutions collect, hold, and process.
- Section 404 of the Sarbanes–Oxley Act of 2002 (SOX) requires publicly traded companies to assess the effectiveness of their internal controls for financial reporting in annual reports they submit at the end of each fiscal year. Chief information officers are responsible for the security, accuracy, and the reliability of the systems that manage and report the financial data. The act also requires publicly traded companies to engage with independent auditors who must attest to, and report on, the validity of their assessments.
- The Payment Card Industry Data Security Standard (PCI DSS) establishes comprehensive requirements for enhancing payment account data security. It was developed by the founding payment brands of the PCI Security Standards Council — including American Express, Discover Financial Services, JCB, MasterCard Worldwide, and Visa International — to help facilitate the broad adoption of consistent data security measures on a global basis. The PCI DSS is a multifaceted security standard that includes requirements for security management, policies, procedures, network architecture, software design, and other critical protective measures.
- State security breach notification laws (California and many others) require businesses, nonprofits, and state institutions to notify consumers when unencrypted "personal information" may have been compromised, lost, or stolen.
- The Personal Information Protection and Electronics Document Act (PIPEDA) of Canada supports and promotes electronic commerce by protecting personal information that is collected, used or disclosed in certain circumstances, by providing for the use of electronic means to communicate or record information or transactions and by amending the Canada Evidence Act, the Statutory Instruments Act and the Statute Revision Act.
- Greece's Hellenic Authority for Communication Security and Privacy (ADAE) (Law 165/2011) establishes and describes the minimum information security controls that should be deployed by every company which provides electronic communication networks and/or services in Greece in order to protect customers' confidentiality. These include both managerial and technical controls (e.g., log records should be stored for two years).
- Greece's Hellenic Authority for Communication Security and Privacy (ADAE) (Law 205/2013) concentrates around the protection of the integrity and availability of the services and data offered by Greek telecommunication companies. The law forces these and other related companies to build, deploy, and test appropriate business continuity plans and redundant infrastructures.

The US Department of Defense (DoD) issued DoD Directive 8570 in 2004, supplemented by DoD Directive 8140, requiring all DoD employees and all DoD contract personnel involved in information assurance roles and activities to earn and maintain various industry Information Technology (IT) certifications in an effort to ensure that all DoD personnel involved in network infrastructure defense have minimum levels of IT industry recognized knowledge, skills and abilities (KSA). Andersson and Reimers (2019) report these certifications range from CompTIA's A+ and Security+ through the ICS2.org's CISSP, etc.

== Culture ==
Describing more than simply how security aware employees are, information security culture is the ideas, customs, and social behaviors of an organization that impact information security in both positive and negative ways. Cultural concepts can help different segments of the organization work effectively or work against effectiveness towards information security within an organization. The way employees think and feel about security and the actions they take can have a big impact on information security in organizations. Roer & Petric (2017) identify seven core dimensions of information security culture in organizations:

- Attitudes: employees' feelings and emotions about the various activities that pertain to the organizational security of information.
- Behaviors: actual or intended activities and risk-taking actions of employees that have direct or indirect impact on information security.
- Cognition: employees' awareness, verifiable knowledge, and beliefs regarding practices, activities, and self-efficacy relation that are related to information security.
- Communication: ways employees communicate with each other, sense of belonging, support for security issues, and incident reporting.
- Compliance: adherence to organizational security policies, awareness of the existence of such policies and the ability to recall the substance of such policies.
- Norms: perceptions of security-related organizational conduct and practices that are informally deemed either normal or deviant by employees and their peers, e.g. hidden expectations regarding security behaviors and unwritten rules regarding uses of information-communication technologies.
- Responsibilities: employees' understanding of the roles and responsibilities they have as a critical factor in sustaining or endangering the security of information, and thereby the organization.

Andersson and Reimers (2014) found that employees often do not see themselves as part of the organization Information Security "effort" and often take actions that ignore organizational information security best interests. Research shows information security culture needs to be improved continuously. In Information Security Culture from Analysis to Change, authors commented, "It's a never ending process, a cycle of evaluation and change or maintenance." To manage the information security culture, five steps should be taken: pre-evaluation, strategic planning, operative planning, implementation, and post-evaluation.

- Pre-evaluation: to identify the awareness of information security within employees and to analyze current security policy
- Strategic planning: to come up a better awareness-program, we need to set clear targets. Clustering people is helpful to achieve it
- Operative planning: create a good security culture based on internal communication, management buy-in, security awareness, and training programs
- Implementation: should feature commitment of management, communication with organizational members, courses for all organizational members, and commitment of the employees
- Post-evaluation: to better gauge the effectiveness of the prior steps and build on continuous improvement

== See also ==
- Backup
- Capability-based security
- Data-centric security
- Enterprise information security architecture
- Gordon–Loeb model for information security investments
- Identity-based security
- Information infrastructure
- Information privacy
- Information security indicators
- Information technology
- IT risk
- ITIL security management
- Kill chain
- List of computer security certifications
- Mobile security
- Network Security Services
- Privacy engineering
- Privacy-enhancing technologies
- Security convergence
- Security information management
- Security level management
- Security of Information Act
- Security service (telecommunication)
- Verification and validation

== Bibliography ==
- Allen, Julia H. (2001). The CERT Guide to System and Network Security Practices. Boston, MA: Addison-Wesley. ISBN 978-0-201-73723-3.
- Krutz, Ronald L.; Russell Dean Vines (2003). The CISSP Prep Guide (Gold ed.). Indianapolis, IN: Wiley. ISBN 978-0-471-26802-4.
- Layton, Timothy P. (2007). Information Security: Design, Implementation, Measurement, and Compliance. Boca Raton, FL: Auerbach publications. ISBN 978-0-8493-7087-8.
- McNab, Chris (2004). Network Security Assessment. Sebastopol, CA: O'Reilly. ISBN 978-0-596-00611-2.
- Peltier, Thomas R. (2001). Information Security Risk Analysis. Boca Raton, FL: Auerbach publications. ISBN 978-0-8493-0880-2.
- Peltier, Thomas R. (2002). Information Security Policies, Procedures, and Standards: guidelines for effective information security management. Boca Raton, FL: Auerbach publications. ISBN 978-0-8493-1137-6.
- White, Gregory (2003). All-in-one Security+ Certification Exam Guide. Emeryville, CA: McGraw-Hill/Osborne. ISBN 978-0-07-222633-1.
- Whitman, Michael; Mattord, Herbert (2017). Principles of Information Security. Cengage. ISBN 978-1-337-10206-3.
