= Oakley protocol =

Key management protocol

The Oakley Key Determination Protocol is a key-agreement protocol that allows authenticated parties to exchange keying material across an insecure connection using the Diffie–Hellman key exchange algorithm. The protocol was proposed by Hilarie K. Orman in 1998, and formed the basis for the more widely used Internet Key Exchange protocol.

The Oakley protocol has also been implemented in Cisco Systems' ISAKMP daemon.

== See also ==
- IPsec cookie exchange
