= Amicima =

American software company, 2004–2007

- Industry: Software
- Founded: 2004
- Founder: Matthew Kaufman; Michael Thornburgh
- Fate: acquired by Adobe Systems
- Headquarters: Santa Cruz, California, United States

Amicima, Inc. was a software company headquartered in Santa Cruz, California, United States, developing new network protocols for client–server and peer-to-peer communication over the Internet and applications using the protocols. Amicima's assets were acquired by Adobe Systems in late 2006.

== History ==
Amicima was founded in 2004 by Matthew Kaufman and Michael Thornburgh, and incorporated in 2005. Amicima's base transport-layer protocol is the Secure Media Flow Protocol (MFP). Amicima made implementations of both MFP and the companion MFPNet peer-to-peer layer available for download as GPL-licensed open-source software libraries.

In May 2006 Amicima released amiciPhone, a Skype-like application for voice over IP, instant messaging, user presence, and file transfer (including photo sharing), as a demonstration of the MFP and MFPNet protocol technology. Amicima applications used a Diffie-Hellman key agreement mode for perfect forward secrecy and Advanced Encryption Standard (AES) 256 for encryption.

By early 2007, the company website was redirected to an Adobe page that announced it had acquired Amicima's assets.
