= Libreswan =

- Release: 3.0 / January 02, 2013
- Stable release: 5.3.1 / 24 June 2026; 20 days ago
- Operating system: Linux
- Predecessor: Openswan, FreeS/WAN
- Available in: C
- Type: IPsec
- License: GNU General Public License
- Website: libreswan.org
- Repository: github.com/libreswan/libreswan

Libreswan is a fork of the Openswan IPsec VPN implementation.

Libreswan was created by almost all of the Openswan developers after a lawsuit about the ownership of the Openswan name was filed against Paul Wouters, the release manager of Openswan, in December 2012. The lawsuit was later settled out of court.

Libreswan supports most of the common types of IPsec configurations people use including configurations like a host-to-host VPN, subnet to subnet VPN.

== See also ==
- StrongSwan
