= Secret law =

Type of law

Secret law refers to legal authorities that require compliance and are classified or otherwise withheld from the public.

== Secret law in the United States ==
Since the 1970s, National Defense Authorization Acts (NDAAs), intelligence authorization acts (IAAs), and Department of Defense appropriations acts (DODAAs) have usually included secret law in the form of classified addenda.

Since about 2015, the branches of the United States federal government have accused one another of creating secret law. Journalists, scholars, and anti-secrecy activists have also made similar allegations. Scholarly analysis has shown that secret law is present in all three branches. The legal scholar Dakota Rudesill recommends that the country resolve whether it will tolerate secret law, believing it to conflict with constitutional norms, and proposes principles for governing it, including public law's supremacy over secret law, public notice of the creation of any secret law, presumptive sunset and announcement dates, and the availability of all records of secret law to Congress. He further proposes a prohibition of secret criminal law or even of any secret law at all (an "Anti-Kafka principle"): "The core abolitionist argument is that secret law does not live up to our constitutional values of the rule of law, political self-government by the people, and their personal self-government."

In Rudesill's view, secret law attempts to free the executive branch from constitutional constraints on its power; yet, when the executive branch or a court acting in secret decides that the government need not follow the law, then the rule of law itself and the principle of separation of powers demand that that fact be made public. Another scholar, Orin Kerr, advocates a "Rule of Lenity" under which "ambiguity in the powers granted to the executive branch in the sections of the United States Code on national security surveillance should trigger a narrow judicial interpretation in favor of the individual and against the State."

The Brennan Center for Justice includes in the category of secret law in the United States classified opinions of the Executive Office of Legal Counsel, described as "authoritative legal interpretations that have the same legal force as the statutes they interpreted"; legal opinions of the Foreign Intelligence Surveillance Court, which approves mass surveillance programs; and more than 800 secret agreements with foreign nations between 2004 and 2014.

The term has been used in reference to some counterterrorist measures taken by the Bush administration following the September 11, 2001, terrorist attacks. The Patriot Act has been said to have secret interpretations.

== Secret rules in UK public places ==
In the United Kingdom, many open places freely accessible by the public are actually privately owned public spaces (POPS). Information on ownership is considered confidential, and not provided either by the owners, or by local councils that have the information. As in any private property the owner may require visitors to abide by specified rules; but people freely accessing the place are not informed of the rules, which may nevertheless be enforced by security guards. Typical prohibitions which do not apply to genuinely public spaces include protesting and photography.

Councils mostly refused to provide information on existing and planned pseudo-public spaces. They also refused to say how information could be obtained, or to provide information on private restrictions on exercising the other rights people have on genuinely public land. Councils were criticized for being under the influence of property developers and corporate owners. Siân Berry, at the time a member of the London Assembly, said "Being able to know what rules you are being governed by, and how to challenge them, is a fundamental part of democracy".

A key exception to this is any public space that has an agreement in place to be compliant with the Public London Charter which, since 2021, is a requirement for London planning authorities in the planning process.

== Literature ==
Secret laws and their negative effects are described in Franz Kafka's novel Der Prozess (The Trial).

== See also ==
- Freedom of information legislation
- Gilmore v. Gonzales
- Glasnost
- Ignorantia juris non excusat
- Promulgation
- Secret treaty
- Secret trial
