= Security association =

A security association (SA) is a simplex (one-way) logical connection between two IPsec peers defining shared security attributes (how the traffic is protected). These security attributes may include: cryptographic algorithm and mode; traffic encryption key; and parameters for the network data to be passed over the connection. The framework for establishing security associations is provided by the Internet Security Association and Key Management Protocol (ISAKMP). Protocols such as Internet Key Exchange (IKE) and Kerberized Internet Negotiation of Keys (KINK) provide authenticated keying material.

The fundamental requirement of an SA arises when the two entities communicate over more than one channel. Take, for example, a mobile subscriber and a base station. The subscriber may subscribe itself to more than one service. Therefore, each service may have different service primitives, such as a data encryption algorithm, public key, or initialization vector. To make things easier, all of this security information is grouped logically, and the logical group itself is a Security Association. Each SA has its own ID called SAID. So both the base station and mobile subscriber will share the SAID, and they will derive all the security parameters.

== See also ==
- Virtual private network (VPN): uses IPsec.
