= Openswan =

- Final release: 3.0.0 / 22 January 2021; 5 years ago
- Operating system: Linux, FreeBSD
- Predecessor: FreeS/WAN
- Available in: C
- Type: IPsec
- License: GNU General Public License
- Website: openswan.org
- Repository: github.com/xelerance/Openswan

In the field of computer security, Openswan provides a complete IPsec implementation for Linux and FreeBSD.

Openswan, begun as a fork of the now-defunct FreeS/WAN project, continues to use the GNU General Public License. Unlike the FreeS/WAN project, it does not exclusively target the Linux operating system.

Libreswan forked from Openswan in 2012.

== See also ==
- Libreswan
- strongSwan
