= Point-to-Point Protocol daemon =

Paul's PPP
- Original author(s): Paul Mackerras, based on earlier work by Drew Perkins, Brad Clements, Karl Fox, Greg Christy, and Brad Parker
- Stable release: 2.5.0 / April 4, 2023; 23 months ago
- Repository: github.com/ppp-project/ppp
- Operating system: Linux, Solaris
- Type: Internet
- License: BSD-like licenses. Not all of them apply to all parts of pppd
- Website: ppp.samba.org

Point-to-Point Protocol daemon (PPPD) is the daemon that implements Point-to-Point Protocol (PPP). PPP is used to manage network connections between two nodes on Unix-like operating systems. It is configured using command-line arguments and configuration files.

While it has initially been used to manage only dial-up access, it is also used to manage broadband connections such as DSL, if Point-to-Point Protocol over Ethernet (PPPoE) or Point-to-Point Protocol over ATM (PPPoA) is used.

The role of pppd is managing PPP session establishment and session termination. During session establishment, pppd has the role of:

- Looped link detection: PPP detects looped links using magic numbers. When PPPD sends PPP LCP messages, these messages include a magic number. If a line is looped, the node receives an LCP message with its own magic number, instead of getting a message with the peer's magic number.
- Automatic self configuration: Using Link Control Protocol it has to negotiate protocol features like Address-and-Control-Field-Compression (ACFC), escaped characters, and the compression, encryption (like MPPE) and authentication methods to use.
- Access control and authentication: Using protocols like Challenge-handshake authentication protocol (CHAP) or Password authentication protocol (PAP) it has to provide and check authentication data.
- Layer 3 configuration: If using Internet Protocol Control Protocol (IPCP), it will negotiate or determine IP parameters such as the IP addresses, the maximum transmission unit, and name server addresses. Some versions may also support Internetwork Packet Exchange Control Protocol (IPXCP) and AppleTalk Control Protocol (ATCP) for routing IPX or AppleTalk over the link.
- After negotiation is complete, it has to set up the required network interfaces and routes, so that the connection is run by the kernel.

pppd terminates a PPP link when:

- too many frames with invalid frame check sequence (FCS) field have been received
- the link is considered "idle" (if configured)
- another program or the peer requests link termination.

Some newer versions of pppd are also capable of handling Dial-on-demand routing, where pppd sets up a virtual network, captures the packages it receives and establishes a PPP connection and forwards the captured and not-yet transmitted packages over the link.

== Frontends and configurators ==
- kppp – A kde GUI frontend for pppd.
- gnome-ppp – A (discontinued) gnome GUI frontend for WvDial, which in turns depends on pppd.
- pppconfig – It uses the standard ppp configuration files and sets ppp up so that the standard pon and poff commands (to connect and disconnect) and plog (to list the log) can be used to control ppp. It includes modem detection.
- WvDial – A CLI tool which is used for modem initialisation before starting pppd.
