= Ppoa =

Ppoa or PPOA may refer to:

- Point-to-Point Protocol over ATM, a network protocol
- Linoleate 8R-lipoxygenase, an enzyme
- 9,12-octadecadienoate 8-hydroperoxide 8R-isomerase, an enzyme
