= Multiprotocol Encapsulation over ATM =

Multiprotocol Encapsulation over ATM is specified in RFC 2684. It defines two mechanisms for identifying the protocol carried in ATM Adaptation Layer 5 (AAL5) frames. It replaces RFC 1483, a standard data link access protocol supported by DSL modems.

RFC 2684 describes two encapsulation mechanisms for network traffic: Virtual Circuit Multiplexing and LLC Encapsulation. Either mechanism carries either routed or bridged protocol data units, and DSL modems often include a setting for RFC 1483 bridging. This is distinct from other "bridge modes" commonly found in combined DSL modems and routers, which turn off the router portion of the DSL modem.

In VC Multiplexing (VC-MUX), the hosts agree on the high-level protocol for a given circuit. It has the advantage of not requiring additional information in a packet, which minimises the overhead. For example, if the hosts agree to transfer IP, a sender can pass each datagram directly to AAL5 to transfer; nothing needs to be sent besides the datagram and the AAL5 trailer. The chief disadvantage of such a scheme lies in duplication of virtual circuits: a host must create a separate virtual circuit for each high-level protocol if more than one protocol is used. Because most carriers charge for each virtual circuit, customers try to avoid using multiple circuits because it adds unnecessary cost.

In LLC Encapsulation the hosts use a single virtual circuit for multiple protocols. This has the advantage of allowing all traffic over the same circuit, but the disadvantage of requiring each packet to contain octets that identify the protocol type, which adds overhead. The scheme also has the disadvantage that packets from all protocols travel with the same delay and priority.

RFC 2684 specifies that hosts can choose between the two methods of using AAL5. Both the sender and receiver must agree on how the circuit will be used, and the agreement may involve manual configuration. Furthermore, the standards suggest that when hosts choose to include type information in the packet, they should use a standard IEEE 802.2 Logical Link Control (LLC) header, followed by a Subnetwork Access Protocol (SNAP) header if necessary.

The AAL5 trailer does not include a type field. Thus, an AAL5 frame is not self-identifying. This means that either the two hosts at the ends of a virtual circuit must agree a priori that the circuit will be used for one specific protocol (e.g., the circuit will only be used to send IP datagrams), or the two hosts at the ends of a virtual circuit must agree a priori that some octets of the data area will be reserved for use as a type field to distinguish packets containing one protocol's data from packets containing another protocol's data.

== See also ==
- Asynchronous Transfer Mode (ATM)
- Point-to-Point Protocol over ATM (PPPoA)
- Broadband Remote Access Server
