= Broadband remote access server =

Routes traffic to an ISP network

xDSL Connectivity diagram

A broadband remote access server (BRAS, B-RAS or BBRAS) routes traffic to and from broadband remote access devices such as digital subscriber line access multiplexers (DSLAM) on an Internet service provider's (ISP) network. BRAS can also be referred to as a broadband network gateway or border network gateway (BNG).

The BRAS sits at the edge of an ISP's core network, and aggregates user sessions from the access network. It is at the BRAS that an ISP can inject policy management and IP quality of service (QoS).

The specific tasks include:

- Aggregates the circuits from one or more link access devices such as DSLAMs
- Provides layer 2 connectivity through either transparent bridging or PPP sessions over Ethernet or ATM sessions
- Enforces QoS policies
- Provides layer 3 connectivity and routes IP traffic through an Internet service provider’s backbone network to the Internet

A DSLAM collects data traffic from multiple subscribers into a centralized point so that it can be transported to a switch or router over a Frame Relay, ATM, or Ethernet connection.

The router provides the logical network termination. Common link access methods include PPP over Ethernet (PPPoE), PPP over ATM (PPPoA) encapsulated sessions, bridged Ethernet over ATM or Frame Relay (RFC 1483/RFC 1490), or just plain Ethernet. In the case of ATM or Frame Relay based access, individual subscribers are identified by Virtual Circuit IDs. Subscribers connected over Ethernet-based remote access devices are usually identified by VLAN IDs or MPLS tags. By acting as the network termination point, the BRAS is responsible for assigning network parameters such as IP addresses to the clients. The BRAS is also the first IP hop from the client to the Internet.

The BRAS is also the interface to authentication, authorization and accounting systems (see RADIUS).

== See also ==
- Digital subscriber line access multiplexer (DSLAM)
- Internet Protocol Control Protocol (IPCP)
- Multi-service access node (MSAN)
