= PPPoX =

PPPoX (PPP over X) designates a family of encapsulating communications protocols implementing Point-to-Point Protocol.

Specific implementations:

- PPPoE: PPP over Ethernet – which can use 802.1q VLANs
- PPPoA: PPP over ATM
- PPTP: PPP encapsulated over GRE with a parallel control connection and some optional encryption
- L2TP v2 (and its ancestor L2F): PPP sessions multiplexed within tunnels and transported over UDP
