= 5,8-linoleate diol synthase =

5,8-linoleate diol synthase may refer to:

- Linoleate 8R-lipoxygenase, an enzyme
- 9,12-octadecadienoate 8-hydroperoxide 8R-isomerase, an enzyme
