= 8-hydroperoxide isomerase =

8-hydroperoxide isomerase may refer to:

- 9,12-octadecadienoate 8-hydroperoxide 8R-isomerase, an enzyme
- 9,12-octadecadienoate 8-hydroperoxide 8S-isomerase, an enzyme
