= IPCP =

IPCP may refer to:

- Internet Protocol Control Protocol
- International Panel on Chemical Pollution established in 2008
- Intellectual Property Code of the Philippines
