= WvDial =

Computer program for assisting modem connections

- Original author: Dave Coombs / Avery Pennarun
- Stable release: 1.61 / September 19, 2009
- Operating system: Linux
- Type: Internet
- License: GNU Lesser General Public License
- Website: alumnit.ca at the Wayback Machine (archived 2011-05-04)
- Repository: github.com/wlach/wvdial

WvDial (pronounced 'weave-dial') is a utility that helps in making modem-based connections to the Internet that is included in some Linux distributions. WvDial is a Point-to-Point Protocol dialer: it dials a modem and starts pppd in order to connect to the Internet. It uses the wvstreams library.

WvDial uses heuristics to guess how to dial and log into a server, alleviating the need to write a login script.

== Graphical frontends ==
There are some GUI tools which allows using WvDial:

- GNOME-PPP, a GUI dialer for GNOME
- kppp, a GUI dialer for KDE
- pyWvDial, a dialer based on PyGTK
- QtWvDialer based on Qt, by Matthias Toussaint
- x-wvdial, that uses xmessage

== See also ==
- Hayes command set
- ifconfig
- NetworkManager
- pppconfig
- Point-to-Point Protocol daemon
- USB modem
