= Point-to-Point Protocol over ATM =

Computer network protocol

In computer networking, the Point-to-Point Protocol over ATM (PPPoA) is a layer 2 data-link protocol typically used to connect domestic broadband modems to ISPs via phone lines. It is used mainly with DOCSIS and DSL carriers, by encapsulating Point-to-Point Protocol (PPP) frames in ATM AAL5. PPPoA is specified by the Internet Engineering Task Force (IETF) in RFC 2364.

It offers standard PPP features such as authentication, encryption, and compression. It also supports the encapsulation types: VC-MUX and LLC — see RFC 2364.

If it is used as the connection encapsulation method on an ATM based network, it can reduce overhead significantly compared with PPPoEoA — by between 0 and ~3.125% for long packets, depending on the packet length and also on the choices of header options in PPPoEoA — see PPPoEoA protocol overheads. This is because it uses headers that are short so imposes minimal overheads, 2 bytes for PPP and 8 bytes for PPPoA (with the RFC2364 VC-MUX option) = 10 bytes.

It also avoids the issues that PPPoE suffers from, related to sometimes needing to use an IP MTU of 1492 bytes or less, lower than the standard 1500 bytes.

The use of PPPoA over PPPoE is not geographically significant; rather, it varies by the provider's preference.

== Configuration ==
Configuration of a PPPoA requires PPP configuration and ATM configuration. These data are generally stored in a cable modem or DSL modem, and may or may not be visible to—or configurable by—an end-user.

PPP configuration generally includes: user credentials, user name and password, and is unique to each user.

ATM configuration includes:

- Virtual channel link (VCL) – virtual path identifier and virtual channel identifier (VPI/VCI), such as 0/32 (analogous to a phone number)
- Modulation (Type): such as G.dmt
- Multiplexing (Method): such as VC-MUX or LLC

ATM configuration can either be performed manually, or it may be hard-coded (or pre-set) into the firmware of a DSL modem provided by the user's ISP; it cannot be automatically negotiated.

== See also ==
- PPPoX
- L2TP
