= SNDCP =

SNDCP, Sub Network Dependent Convergence Protocol, is part of layer 3 of a GPRS protocol specification. SNDCP interfaces to the Internet Protocol at the top, and to the GPRS-specific Logical Link Control (LLC) protocol at the bottom.

In the spirit of the GPRS specifications, there can be many implementations of SNDCP, supporting protocols such as X.25. However, in reality, IP (Internet Protocol) is such an overwhelming standard that X.25 has become irrelevant for modern applications, so all implementations of SNDCP for GPRS only support IP as the payload type.

The SNDCP layer is relevant to the protocol stack of the mobile station and that of the SGSN, and works when a PDP Context is established and the quality of service has been negotiated.

== Services offered by SNDCP ==
The SNDCP layer primarily converts, encapsulates and segments external network formats (like Internet Protocol Datagrams) into sub-network formats (called SNPDUs). It also performs compression of NPDUs to make for efficient Data transmission. It performs the multiple PDP Context PDU transfers and it also ensures that NPDUs from each PDP Context are transmitted to the LLC layer in sufficient time to maintain the QoS. SNDCP provides services to the higher layers which may include connectionless and connection-oriented mode, compression, multiplexing and segmentation.
