= Layer 2 Forwarding Protocol =

Cisco VPN tunneling protocol

L2F, or Layer 2 Forwarding, is a tunneling protocol developed by Cisco to establish virtual private network connections over the Internet. L2F does not provide encryption or confidentiality by itself; It relies on the protocol being tunneled to provide privacy. L2F was specifically designed to tunnel Point-to-Point Protocol (PPP) traffic.

== Use ==
Virtual dial-up allows many separate and autonomous protocol domains to share common access infrastructure including modems, Access Servers, and ISDN routers. RFCs prior to 2341 have specified protocols for supporting IP dial-up via SLIP and multiprotocol dial-up via PPP.

== L2F packet structure ==
Bits 0-12													13-15	16-23	24-31
F	K	P	S	0	0	0	0	0	0	0	0	C	Ver	Protocol	Sequence (opt)
Multiplex ID														Client ID	
Length														Payload offset (opt)	
Packet key (optional)
Payload
														L2F Checksum (opt)	

== Other VPN protocols ==
- IPsec
- L2TP Layer 2 Tunneling Protocol
- PPTP Point-to-Point Tunneling Protocol
