= Redback Networks =

American technology company

- Industry: Telecommunications equipment
- Founded: 1996; 30 years ago
- Founder: Gaurav Garg; Asher Waldfogel
- Fate: Acquired by Ericsson
- Headquarters: San Jose, California
- Key people: Georges Antoun, CEO

Redback Networks provided hardware and software used by Internet service providers to manage broadband services. The company's products included the SMS (Subscriber Management System), SmartEdge, and SmartMetro product lines.

In January 2007, the company was acquired by Ericsson.

== History ==
Redback Networks was founded in August 1996 by Gaurav Garg, Asher Waldfogel, and William M. Salkewicz. The company received seed money from Sequoia Capital.

In May 1999, during the dot-com bubble, the company became a public company via an initial public offering. After pricing at $23 each, shares soared 266% on the first day of trading.

In November 1999, the company acquired Siara Systems, which at the time only had products in the prototype stage, for $4.3 billion in stock.

In 2000, its share price peaked at $198 but fell to $0.27 in October 2002, after the burst of the dot-com bubble.

In August 2000, the company acquired Abatis Systems.

In October 2000, the company opened a regional headquarters in Hong Kong.

In January 2007, the company was acquired by Ericsson for $1.9 billion, or $25 per share.
