= Linoleate 8R-lipoxygenase =

Identifiers
- EC no.: 1.13.11.60

Databases
- IntEnz: IntEnz view
- BRENDA: BRENDA entry
- ExPASy: NiceZyme view
- KEGG: KEGG entry
- MetaCyc: metabolic pathway
- PRIAM: profile
- PDB structures: RCSB PDB PDBe PDBsum
Search
- PMC: articles
- PubMed: articles
- NCBI: proteins

Linoleate 8R-lipoxygenase (EC 1.13.11.60, linoleic acid 8R-dioxygenase, 5,8-LDS (bifunctional enzyme), 7,8-LDS (bifunctional enzyme), 5,8-linoleate diol synthase (bifunctional enzyme), 7,8-linoleate diol synthase (bifunctional enzyme), PpoA) is an enzyme with systematic name linoleate:oxygen (8R)-oxidoreductase. This enzyme catalyses the following chemical reaction

linoleate + O_{2} $\rightleftharpoons$ (8R,9Z,12Z)-8-hydroperoxyoctadeca-9,12-dienoate

Linoleate 8R-lipoxygenase contains heme.
