= Link Control Protocol =

In computer networking, the Link Control Protocol (LCP) forms part of the Point-to-Point Protocol (PPP), within the family of Internet protocols. In setting up PPP communications, both the sending and receiving devices send out LCP packets to determine the standards of the ensuing data transmission.

The protocol:

- checks the identity of the linked device and either accepts or rejects the device
- determines the acceptable packet size for transmission
- searches for errors in configuration
- can terminate the link if requirements exceed the parameters

LCP packets are sent during the Link Establishment Phase of PPP, after the physical layer has been made ready from the Link Dead state. No transmission of network-layer protocols such as IP may be transmitted across PPP until after the Link Establishment or Authentication phases are complete. When a connection is requested by a peer to be terminated (or if Authentication fails), the Link Termination Phase is performed, and PPP returns to the Link Dead state.

== Structure ==
Offsets	Octet	0								1								2								3							
Octet	Bit	0	1	2	3	4	5	6	7	8	9	10	11	12	13	14	15	16	17	18	19	20	21	22	23	24	25	26	27	28	29	30	31
Point-to-Point Protocol
0	0	Flag (0x7E)								Address (0xFF)								Control (0x03)								Protocol (0xC0)							
4	32	Protocol, cont. (0x21)																															
Link Control Protocol
0	0	Code								Identifier								Length															
		Link Configuration																															
		Code		1	Name		Configure-Request					Description				Peer requesting connection with the specified options over link defaults.																	
		Code		2	Name		Configure-Ack					Description				Peer requesting connection with the specified options over link defaults.																	
		Code		3	Name		Configure-Nak					Description				Peer recognizes given options, but some are not acceptable.																	
		Code		4	Name		Configure-Reject					Description				Peer does not recognize or is prohibited from accepting some given options.																	
4	32	List of option data, size variable																															
		Link Termination																															
		Code		5	Name		Terminate-Request					Description				Peer requesting to close the connection.																	
		Code		6	Name		Terminate-Ack					Description				Peer accepts connection closure, or requires re-negotiation.																	
4	32	Uninterpreted data by the sender, size variable																															
		Link Maintenance																															
		Code		7	Name	Code-Reject					Description		Peer does not recognize a provided LCP code.																				
4	32	Faulting LCP Packet, size variable																															
				LCP-Specific Codes																													
		Code		8	Name	Protocol-Reject					Description		Peer does not recognize a protocol used within the LCP Opened state.																				
4	32	Rejected PPP Protocol																Faulting Packet, size variable															
		Code		9	Name	Echo-Request					Description			Peer is requesting an Echo-Reply.																			
		Code		10	Name	Echo-Reply					Description			Peer is responding to an Echo-Request (only acceptable when in LCP Opened.)																			
		Code		11	Name	Discard-Request					Description			Peer is sending data to be discarded ("sinked") by the remote peer.																			
4	32	Magic Number (0, if Configure-Request / Configure-Ack have not established one yet)																															
8	64	Uninterpreted data by the sender, size variable																															

=== Link Configuration Option ===
Offsets	Octet	0								1								2								3							
Octet	Bit	0	1	2	3	4	5	6	7	8	9	10	11	12	13	14	15	16	17	18	19	20	21	22	23	24	25	26	27	28	29	30	31
0	0	Type								Length																							
		Type		0	Name		Vendor Specific					Description			Vendor specific data not defined by the PPP specification.																		
2	16	Vendor's Organizationally Unique Identifier																								Kind (OUI Subtype)							
6	48	Vendor defined data, size variable																															
		Type		1	Name		Maximum-Receive-Unit					Description			Defines a peer's MRU, overriding the default of 1,500 octets.																		
2	16	The maximum-receive-unit for this peer's implementation																															
		Type		3	Name		Authentication-Protocol					Description			Defines an authentication protocol for a remote peer to authenticate with before transitioning phases.																		
2	16	The requested authentication protocol, assigned by IANA																Additional data for this protocol, size variable															
		Type		4	Name		Quality-Protocol					Description			Defines a quality protocol for link quality monitoring.																		
2	16	The requested quality protocol																Additional data for this protocol, size variable															
		Type		5	Name		Magic-Number					Description			Defines a unique identifier for a peer.																		
2	16	Magic number																															
		Type		7	Name		Protocol-Field-Compression						Description			No data. Refer to RFC 1661 Section 6.5 for details.																	
		Type		8	Name		Address-and-Control-Field-Compression								Description			No data. Refer to RFC 1661 Section 6.6 for details.															
