= 9,12-octadecadienoate 8-hydroperoxide 8R-isomerase =

Class of enzymes

Identifiers
- EC no.: 5.4.4.5

Databases
- IntEnz: IntEnz view
- BRENDA: BRENDA entry
- ExPASy: NiceZyme view
- KEGG: KEGG entry
- MetaCyc: metabolic pathway
- PRIAM: profile
- PDB structures: RCSB PDB PDBe PDBsum
Search
- PMC: articles
- PubMed: articles
- NCBI: proteins

9,12-octadecadienoate 8-hydroperoxide 8R-isomerase (EC 5.4.4.5, 5,8-LDS (bifunctional enzyme), 5,8-linoleate diol synthase (bifunctional enzyme), 8-hydroperoxide isomerase, (8R,9Z,12Z)-8-hydroperoxy-9,12-octadecadienoate mutase ((5S,8R,9Z,12Z)-5,8-dihydroxy-9,12-octadecadienoate-forming), PpoA) is an enzyme with systematic name (8R,9Z,12Z)-8-hydroperoxyoctadeca-9,12-dienoate hydroxymutase ((5S,8R,9Z,12Z)-5,8-dihydroxyoctadeca-9,12-dienoate-forming). This enzyme catalyses the following chemical reaction

(8R,9Z,12Z)-8-hydroperoxyoctadeca-9,12-dienoate $\rightleftharpoons$ (5S,8R,9Z,12Z)-5,8-dihydroxyoctadeca-9,12-dienoate

This enzyme contains heme.
