= AirMarshal =

Web-based authentication for Ethernet

AirMarshal is a web-based authentication server or captive portal for Ethernet based networks. Similar technology is in use popularly to control access to many of today's Internet HotSpots. While Air Marshal is sold commercially the software is free to smaller network operators for up to 5 simultaneously logged on users.

== Feature Summary ==
- Network authentication, authorization and accounting are provided via the RADIUS/AAA protocol.
- A variety of network topologies are supported by Air Marshal including Layer 3 routing, NAT and Layer 2 transparent bridging.

== Release Chronology ==
- March 2003 - Version 1 - first commercial release.
- May 2006 - Final maintenance release of the version 1 series.
- August 2007 - Version 2 - released as a free upgrade with more than 30 new features.
