= Woo–Lam =

In cryptography, Woo–Lam refers to various computer network authentication protocols designed by Simon S. Lam and Thomas Woo. The protocols enable two communicating parties to authenticate each other's identity and to exchange session keys, and involve the use of a trusted key distribution center (KDC) to negotiate between the parties. Both symmetric-key and public-key variants have been described. However, the protocols suffer from various security flaws, and in part have been described as being inefficient compared to alternative authentication protocols.

== Public-key protocol ==
=== Notation ===
The following notation is used to describe the algorithm:

$A,B$ - network nodes.
$KU_x$ - public key of node $x$.
$KR_x$ - private key of $x$.
$N_x$ - nonce chosen by $x$.
$ID_x$ - unique identifier of $x$.
$E_k$ - public-key encryption using key $k$.
$S_k$ - digital signature using key $k$.
$K$ - random session key chosen by the KDC.
$||$ - concatenation.

It is assumed that all parties know the KDC's public key.

=== Message exchange ===
$$1) A \rightarrow KDC : ID_A || ID_B$$

$$2) KDC \rightarrow A : S_{KR_{KDC}}[ID_B||KU_B]$$

$$3) A \rightarrow B : E_{KU_B}[N_A||ID_A]$$

$$4) B \rightarrow KDC: ID_B||ID_A||E_{KU_{KDC}}[N_A]$$

$$5) KDC \rightarrow B : S_{KR_{KDC}}[ID_A||KU_A]||E_{KU_B}[S_{KR_{KDC}}[N_A||K||ID_B||ID_A]]$$

$$6) B \rightarrow A : E_{KU_A}[S_{KR_{KDC}}[N_A || K ] || N_B]$$

$$7) A \rightarrow B : E_{K}[N_B]$$

The original version of the protocol had the identifier $ID_A$ omitted from lines 5 and 6, which did not account for the fact that $N_A$ is unique only among nonces generated by A and not by other parties. The protocol was revised after the authors themselves spotted a flaw in the algorithm.

== See also ==
- Kerberos
- Needham–Schroeder protocol
- Otway–Rees protocol
