= Stream Control Transmission Protocol =

Computer network protocol

- Protocol stack
- Abbreviation: SCTP
- Introduction: 2000
- OSI layer: Transport layer (4)
- IP number: 132
- RFC: 9260

The Stream Control Transmission Protocol (SCTP) is a computer networking communications protocol in the transport layer of the Internet protocol suite. Originally intended for Signaling System 7 (SS7) message transport in telecommunication, the protocol provides the message-oriented feature of the User Datagram Protocol (UDP) while ensuring reliable, in-sequence transport of messages with congestion control like the Transmission Control Protocol (TCP). Unlike UDP and TCP, the protocol supports multihoming and redundant paths to increase resilience and reliability.

SCTP is standardized by the Internet Engineering Task Force (IETF) in RFC 9260. The SCTP reference implementation was released as part of FreeBSD version 7 in 2008 and has since been widely ported to other platforms.

== Formal oversight ==
The IETF Signaling Transport (SIGTRAN) working group defined the protocol (number 132) in October 2000, and the IETF Transport Area (TSVWG) working group maintains it. RFC 9260 defines the protocol. RFC 3286 provides an introduction.

== Message-based multi-streaming ==
SCTP applications submit data for transmission in messages (groups of bytes) to the SCTP transport layer. SCTP places messages and control information into separate chunks (data chunks and control chunks), each identified by a chunk header. The protocol can fragment a message into multiple data chunks, but each data chunk contains data from only one user message. SCTP bundles the chunks into SCTP packets. The SCTP packet, which is submitted to the Internet Protocol, consists of a packet header, SCTP control chunks (when necessary), followed by SCTP data chunks (when available).

SCTP may be characterized as message-oriented, meaning it transports a sequence of messages (each being a group of bytes), rather than transporting an unbroken stream of bytes as in TCP. As in UDP, in SCTP a sender sends a message in one operation, and that exact message is passed to the receiving application process in one operation. In contrast, TCP is a stream-oriented protocol, transporting streams of bytes reliably and in order. However TCP does not allow the receiver to know how many times the sender application called on the TCP transport passing it groups of bytes to be sent out. At the sender, TCP simply appends more bytes to a queue of bytes waiting to go out over the network, rather than having to keep a queue of individual separate outbound messages which must be preserved as such.

The term multi-streaming refers to the capability of SCTP to transmit several independent streams of chunks in parallel, for example transmitting web page images simultaneously with the web page text. In essence, it involves bundling several connections into a single SCTP association, operating on messages (or chunks) rather than bytes.

TCP preserves byte order in the stream by including a byte sequence number with each segment. SCTP, on the other hand, assigns a sequence number or a message-id (Note: The DATA chunk uses a sequence number for ordered messages, the I-DATA chunk, which solves some problems with the original DATA chunk, uses a message-id for all messages) to each message sent in a stream. This allows independent ordering of messages in different streams. However, message ordering is optional in SCTP; a receiving application may choose to process messages in the order of receipt instead of in the order of sending.

== Features ==
Features of SCTP include:

- Reliable transmission of both ordered and unordered data streams
- Multihoming support in which one or both endpoints of a connection can consist of more than one IP address, enabling transparent fail-over between redundant network paths
- Delivery of chunks within independent streams eliminates unnecessary head-of-line blocking, as opposed to TCP byte-stream delivery.
- Explicit partial reliability
- Path selection and monitoring to select a primary data transmission path and test the connectivity of the transmission path
- Validation and acknowledgment mechanisms protect against flooding attacks and provide notification of duplicated or missing data chunks.
- Improved error detection suitable for Ethernet jumbo frames

The designers of SCTP originally intended it for the transport of telephony (i.e. Signaling System 7) over Internet Protocol, with the goal of duplicating some of the reliability attributes of the SS7 signaling network in IP. This IETF effort is known as SIGTRAN. In the meantime, other uses have been proposed, for example, the Diameter protocol and Reliable Server Pooling (RSerPool).

== Motivation and adoption ==
TCP has provided the primary means to transfer data reliably across the Internet. However, TCP has imposed limitations on several applications. From RFC 4960:

- TCP provides both reliable data transfer and strict order-of-transmission delivery of data. Some applications need reliable transfer without sequence maintenance, while others would be satisfied with partial ordering of the data. In both of these cases, the head-of-line blocking property of TCP causes unnecessary delay.
- For applications exchanging distinct records or messages, the stream-oriented nature of TCP requires the addition of explicit markers or other encoding to delineate the individual records.
- In order to avoid sending many small IP packets where one single larger packet would have sufficed, the TCP implementation may delay transmitting data while waiting for possibly more data being queued by the application (Nagle's algorithm). Although many TCP implementations allow the disabling of Nagle's algorithm, this is not required by the specification. SCTP, on the other hand, allows undelayed transmission to be configured as a default for an association, eliminating any undesired delays, but at the cost of higher transfer overhead.
- The limited scope of TCP sockets complicates the task of providing highly-available data transfer capability using multihomed hosts.
- TCP is relatively vulnerable to denial-of-service attacks, such as SYN attacks.

Adoption of SCTP has been slowed by lack of awareness, lack of implementations (particularly in Microsoft Windows), lack of application support and lack of network support.

SCTP has seen adoption in the mobile telephony space as the transport protocol for several core network interfaces.

== Multihoming ==
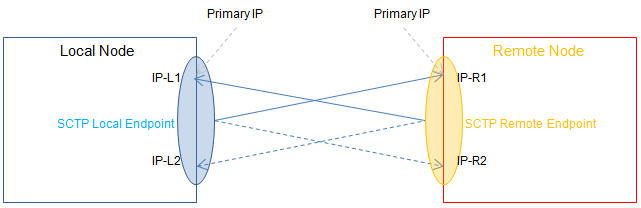
SCTP multihoming

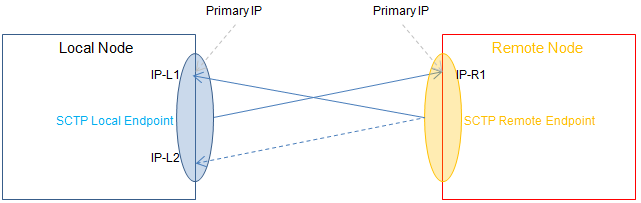
Asymmetric multihoming: local multihoming to remote single homing

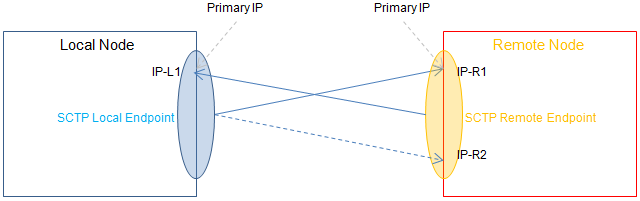
Asymmetric multihoming: local single homing to remote multihoming

SCTP provides redundant paths to increase reliability.

Each SCTP end point needs to check reachability of the primary and redundant addresses of the remote end point using a heartbeat. Each SCTP end point needs to acknowledge the heartbeats it receives from the remote end point.

When SCTP sends a message to a remote address, the source interface will only be decided by the routing table of the host (and not by SCTP).

In asymmetric multihoming, one of the two endpoints does not support multihoming.

In local multihoming and remote single homing, if the remote primary address is not reachable, the SCTP association fails even if an alternate path is possible.

== Packet structure ==
An SCTP packet consists of two basic sections:

1. The common header, which occupies the first 12 bytes and is highlighted in blue.
2. The data chunks, which occupy the remaining portion of the packet. The first chunk is highlighted in green, and the last of N chunks (Chunk N) is highlighted in red.

Bits	0–7	8–15	16–23	24–31
+0	Source port		Destination port	
32	Verification tag			
64	Checksum			
96	Chunk 1 type	Chunk 1 flags	Chunk 1 length	
128	Chunk 1 data			
…	…			
…	Chunk N type	Chunk N flags	Chunk N length	
…	Chunk N data			

Each chunk starts with a one-byte type identifier, with 15 chunk types defined by RFC 9260, and at least 5 more defined by additional RFCs. (Note: See SCTP packet structure for more details.) Eight flag bits, a two-byte length field, and the data compose the remainder of the chunk. If the chunk does not form a multiple of 4 bytes (i.e., the length is not a multiple of 4), then it is padded with zeros, which are not included in the chunk length. The two-byte length field limits each chunk to a 65,535-byte length (including the type, flags and length fields).

== Security ==
Although encryption was not part of the original SCTP design, SCTP was designed with features for improved security, such as 4-way handshake (compared to TCP 3-way handshake) to protect against SYN flooding attacks, and large "cookies" for association verification and authenticity.

Reliability was also a key part of the security design of SCTP. Multihoming enables an association to stay open even when some routes and interfaces are down. This is of particular importance for SIGTRAN as it carries SS7 over an IP network using SCTP, and requires strong resilience during link outages to maintain telecommunication service even when enduring network anomalies.

== Implementations ==
The SCTP reference implementation runs on FreeBSD, Mac OS X, Microsoft Windows, and Linux.

The following operating systems implement SCTP:

- AIX Version 5 and newer
- NetBSD since 8.0
- Cisco IOS 12 and above
- DragonFly BSD since version 1.4, however support is being deprecated in version 4.2
- FreeBSD, version 7 and above, contains the reference SCTP implementation
- HP-UX, 11i v2 and above
- illumos
- Linux kernel 2.4 and above
- QNX Neutrino Realtime OS, 6.3.0 to 6.3.2, deprecated since 6.4.0
- Tru64 with the Compaq SCTP add-on package
- Sun Solaris 10 and above
- VxWorks versions 6.2.x to 6.4.x, and 6.7 and newer

Third-party drivers:

- Microsoft Windows:
  - The SctpDrv kernel driver is a port of the BSD SCTP stack to Windows (Abandoned after 2012)
- MacOS:
  - SCTP Network Kernel Extension for Mac OS X

Userspace library:

- Portable SCTP userland stack
- The SCTP library
  - Windows XP port
- Oracle Java SE 7
- Erlang/OTP

The following applications implement SCTP:

- WebRTC
- NetFlow

=== Tunneling over UDP ===
In the absence of native SCTP support in operating systems, it is possible to tunnel SCTP over UDP, as well as to map TCP API calls to SCTP calls so existing applications can use SCTP without modification.

== RFCs ==
- RFC 9260 Stream Control Transmission Protocol
- RFC 8540 Stream Control Transmission Protocol: Errata and Issues in RFC 4960 (obsoleted by RFC 9260)
- RFC 7829 SCTP-PF: A Quick Failover Algorithm for the Stream Control Transmission Protocol
- RFC 7765 TCP and Stream Control Transmission Protocol (SCTP) RTO Restart
- RFC 7496 Additional Policies for the Partially Reliable Stream Control Transmission Protocol Extension
- RFC 7053 SACK-IMMEDIATELY Extension for the Stream Control Transmission Protocol (obsoleted by RFC 9260)
- RFC 6951 UDP Encapsulation of Stream Control Transmission Protocol (SCTP) Packets for End-Host to End-Host Communication
- RFC 6525 Stream Control Transmission Protocol (SCTP) Stream Reconfiguration
- RFC 6458 Sockets API Extensions for the Stream Control Transmission Protocol (SCTP)
- RFC 6096 Stream Control Transmission Protocol (SCTP) Chunk Flags Registration (obsoleted by RFC 9260)
- RFC 5062 Security Attacks Found Against the Stream Control Transmission Protocol (SCTP) and Current Countermeasures
- RFC 5061 Stream Control Transmission Protocol (SCTP) Dynamic Address Reconfiguration
- RFC 5043 Stream Control Transmission Protocol (SCTP) Direct Data Placement (DDP) Adaptation
- RFC 4960 Stream Control Transmission Protocol (obsoleted by RFC 9260)
- RFC 4895 Authenticated Chunks for the Stream Control Transmission Protocol (SCTP)
- RFC 4820 Padding Chunk and Parameter for the Stream Control Transmission Protocol (SCTP)
- RFC 4460 Stream Control Transmission Protocol (SCTP) Specification Errata and Issues (obsoleted by RFC 9260)
- RFC 3873 Stream Control Transmission Protocol (SCTP) Management Information Base (MIB)
- RFC 3758 Stream Control Transmission Protocol (SCTP) Partial Reliability Extension
- RFC 3554 On the Use of Stream Control Transmission Protocol (SCTP) with IPsec
- RFC 3436 Transport Layer Security over Stream Control Transmission Protocol
- RFC 3309 Stream Control Transmission Protocol (SCTP) Checksum Change (obsoleted by RFC 4960)
- RFC 3286 An Introduction to the Stream Control Transmission Protocol
- RFC 3257 Stream Control Transmission Protocol Applicability Statement
- RFC 2960 Stream Control Transmission Protocol (updated by RFC 3309 and obsoleted by RFC 4960)

== See also ==
- Transport layer § Comparison of transport layer protocols
- Session Initiation Protocol (SIP) – which may initiate multiple streams over SCTP, TCP, or UDP
- Multipath TCP – which allows a TCP connection to use multiple paths to maximize resource usage and increase redundancy
- Happy Eyeballs – originally designed for efficient selection of IPv4 or IPv6 for a connection; could also be adapted to select from different transport protocols such as TCP and SCTP
