= Diameter (protocol) =

Computer network protocol

Diameter is an authentication, authorization, and accounting (AAA) protocol for computer networks. It evolved from the earlier RADIUS protocol. It belongs to the application layer protocols in the Internet protocol suite.

Diameter Applications extend the base protocol by adding new commands and/or attributes, such as those for use with the Extensible Authentication Protocol (EAP).

== Comparison with RADIUS ==
The name is a play on words, derived from the RADIUS protocol, which is the predecessor (a diameter is twice the radius). Diameter is not directly backward compatible but provides an upgrade path for RADIUS. The main features provided by Diameter but lacking in RADIUS are:

- Support for SCTP
- Capability negotiation
- Application layer acknowledgements; Diameter defines failover methods and state machines (RFC 3539)
- Extensibility; new commands can be defined
- Aligned on 32 bit boundaries

Also: Like RADIUS, it is intended to work in both local and roaming AAA situations. It uses TCP or SCTP, unlike RADIUS which uses UDP. Unlike RADIUS it includes no encryption but can be protected by transport-level security (IPSEC or TLS). The base size of the AV identifier is 32 bit unlike RADIUS which uses 8 bit as the base AV identifier size. Like RADIUS, it supports stateless as well as stateful modes. Like RADIUS, it supports application-layer acknowledgment and defines failover. Diameter is used for many different interfaces defined by the 3GPP standards, with each interface typically defining new commands and attributes.

== Applications ==
A Diameter Application is not a software application but is a protocol based on the Diameter base protocol defined in RFC 6733 (obsoletes RFC 3588) and RFC 7075. Each application is defined by an application identifier and can add new command codes and/or new mandatory AVPs (Attribute-Value Pair). Adding a new optional AVP does not require a new application.

Examples of Diameter applications:

- Diameter Mobile IPv4 Application (MobileIP, RFC 4004)
- Diameter Network Access Server Application (NASREQ, RFC 7155)(Obsoletes: RFC 4005)
- Diameter Extensible Authentication Protocol Application (RFC 4072)
- Diameter Credit-Control Application (DCCA, RFC 8506])(Obsoletes: RFC 4006)
- Diameter Session Initiation Protocol Application (RFC 4740)
- Various applications in the 3GPP IP Multimedia Subsystem

Both the HSS and the SLF communicate using the Diameter protocol.

(Generic Bootstrapping Architecture): Bootstrapping Server Function

== History ==
The Diameter protocol was initially developed by Pat R. Calhoun, Glen Zorn, and Ping Pan in 1998 to provide a framework for authentication, authorization, and accounting (AAA) that could overcome the limitations of RADIUS. At the time Diameter was designed, RADIUS was believed to have issues with reliability, scalability, security, and flexibility. RADIUS also did not support large policies which were needed for telephony applications. The Diameter protocol defines a policy protocol used by clients to perform Policy, AAA, and resource control. This allows a single server to handle policies for many services.

Like RADIUS, Diameter provides AAA functionality, but uses TCP and SCTP instead of UDP, therefore delegating detection and handling of communication problems to those protocols. The Diameter protocol is enhanced further by the development of the 3rd Generation Partnership Project (3GPP) IP Multimedia Subsystem (IMS). The S6a, S6b, Gx, Gy, Sy, Rx, Cx, Dh, Dx, Rf, Ro, Sh and Zh interfaces are supported by Diameter applications. Through the use of extensions, the protocol was designed to be extensible to support proxies, brokers, strong security, mobile IP, network-access servers (NASREQ), accounting and resource management.

== Protocol description ==
The Diameter base protocol is defined by RFC 6733 (Obsoletes: RFC 3588 and RFC 5719) and defines the minimum requirements for an AAA protocol. Diameter Applications can extend the base protocol by adding new commands, attributes, or both. Diameter security is provided by IPsec or TLS. The IANA has assigned TCP and SCTP port number 3868 to Diameter, as stated in section 11.4 of RFC 6733.

=== Packet format ===
The packet consists of a Diameter header and a variable number of Attribute–Value Pairs, or AVPs, for encapsulating information relevant to the Diameter message.

Diameter Header
Bit offset	0	1	2	3	4	5	6	7	8	9	10	11	12	13	14	15	16	17	18	19	20	21	22	23	24	25	26	27	28	29	30	31
0	version								message length																							
32	R	P	E	T					command code																							
64	application ID																															
96	hop-by-hop ID																															
128	end-to-end ID																															
160...	AVPs...																															

=== Version ===
This field indicates the version of the Diameter Base Protocol. As of 2014, the only value supported is 1.

=== Message length ===
The Message Length field indicates the length of the Diameter message in bytes, including the header fields and the padded AVPs.

=== Command flags ===
The "R" (Request) bit – If set, the message is a request. If cleared, the message is an answer.

The "P" (Proxiable) bit – If set, the message MAY be proxied, relayed or redirected. If cleared, the message MUST be locally processed.

The "E" (Error) bit – If set, the message contains a protocol error, and the message will not conform to the CCF described for this command. Messages with the "E" bit set are commonly referred to as error messages. This bit MUST NOT be set in request messages.

The "T" (Potentially re-transmitted message) bit – This flag is set after a link failover procedure, to aid the removal of duplicate requests. It is set when resending requests not yet acknowledged as an indication of a possible duplicate due to a link failure.

=== Commands ===
Each command Request/Answer pair is assigned a command code. Whether it is the request or answer is identified via the 'R' bit in the Command Flags field of the header.

The values 0-255 are reserved for RADIUS backward compatibility. The values 256-16777213 are for permanent, standard commands allocated by IANA. The values 16777214 and 16777215 (hex 0xFFFFFE and 0xFFFFFF) are reserved for experimental and testing purposes.

A Command Code is used to determine the action that is to be taken for a particular message. Some common Diameter commands defined in the protocol (base and applications) are:

Command-Name	Abbr.	Code	Application
AA-Request	AAR	265	Diameter NAS Application - RFC 7155
AA-Answer	AAA	265	Diameter NAS Application - RFC 7155
Diameter-EAP-Request	DER	268	Diameter EAP Application - RFC 4072
Diameter-EAP-Answer	DEA	268	Diameter EAP Application - RFC 4072
Abort-Session-Request	ASR	274	Diameter base
Abort-Session-Answer	ASA	274	Diameter base
Accounting-Request	ACR	271	Diameter base
Accounting-Answer	ACA	271	Diameter base
Credit-Control-Request	CCR	272	Diameter Credit-Control Application - RFC 8506 (Obsoletes RFC 4006)
Credit-Control-Answer	CCA	272	Diameter Credit-Control Application - RFC 8506 (Obsoletes RFC 4006)
Capabilities-Exchange-Request	CER	257	Diameter base
Capabilities-Exchange-Answer	CEA	257	Diameter base
Device-Watchdog-Request	DWR	280	Diameter base
Device-Watchdog-Answer	DWA	280	Diameter base
Disconnect-Peer-Request	DPR	282	Diameter base
Disconnect-Peer-Answer	DPA	282	Diameter base
Re-Auth-Request	RAR	258	Diameter base
Re-Auth-Answer	RAA	258	Diameter base
Session-Termination-Request	STR	275	Diameter base
Session-Termination-Answer	STA	275	Diameter base
User-Authorization-Request	UAR	283	Diameter SIP Application - RFC 4740
User-Authorization-Answer	UAA	283	Diameter SIP Application - RFC 4740
Server-Assignment-Request	SAR	284	Diameter SIP Application - RFC 4740
Server-Assignment-Answer	SAA	284	Diameter SIP Application - RFC 4740
Location-Info-Request	LIR	285	Diameter SIP Application - RFC 4740
Location-Info-Answer	LIA	285	Diameter SIP Application - RFC 4740
Multimedia-Auth-Request	MAR	286	Diameter SIP Application - RFC 4740
Multimedia-Auth-Answer	MAA	286	Diameter SIP Application - RFC 4740
Registration-Termination-Request	RTR	287	Diameter SIP Application - RFC 4740
Registration-Termination-Answer	RTA	287	Diameter SIP Application - RFC 4740
Push-Profile-Request	PPR	288	Diameter SIP Application - RFC 4740
Push-Profile-Answer	PPA	288	Diameter SIP Application - RFC 4740
User-Authorization-Request	UAR	300	Diameter base (3GPP) RFC 3589
User-Authorization-Answer	UAA	300	Diameter base (3GPP) RFC 3589
Server-Assignment-Request	SAR	301	Diameter base (3GPP) RFC 3589
Server-Assignment-Answer	SAA	301	Diameter base (3GPP) RFC 3589
Location-Info-Request	LIR	302	Diameter base (3GPP) RFC 3589
Location-Info-Answer	LIA	302	Diameter base (3GPP) RFC 3589
Multimedia-Auth-Request	MAR	303	Diameter base (3GPP) RFC 3589
Multimedia-Auth-Answer	MAA	303	Diameter base (3GPP) RFC 3589
Registration-Termination-Request	RTR	304	Diameter base (3GPP) RFC 3589
Registration-Termination-Answer	RTA	304	Diameter base (3GPP) RFC 3589
Push-Profile-Request	PPR	305	Diameter base (3GPP) RFC 3589
Push-Profile-Answer	PPA	305	Diameter base (3GPP) RFC 3589
User-Data-Request	UDR	306	Diameter base (3GPP) RFC 3589
User-Data-Answer	UDA	306	Diameter base (3GPP) RFC 3589
Profile-Update-Request	PUR	307	Diameter base (3GPP) RFC 3589
Profile-Update-Answer	PUA	307	Diameter base (3GPP) RFC 3589
Subscribe-Notifications-Request	SNR	308	Diameter base (3GPP) RFC 3589
Subscribe-Notifications-Answer	SNA	308	Diameter base (3GPP) RFC 3589
Push-Notification-Request	PNR	309	Diameter base (3GPP) RFC 3589
Push-Notification-Answer	PNA	309	Diameter base (3GPP) RFC 3589
Bootstrapping-Info-Request	BIR	310	Diameter base (3GPP) RFC 3589
Bootstrapping-Info-Answer	BIA	310	Diameter base (3GPP) RFC 3589
Message-Process-Request	MPR	311	Diameter base (3GPP) RFC 3589
Message-Process-Answer	MPA	311	Diameter base (3GPP) RFC 3589
Update-Location-Request	ULR	316	3GPP TS 29.272 [RFC 5516]
Update-Location-Answer	ULA	316	3GPP TS 29.272 [RFC 5516]
Cancel-Location-Request	CLR	317	3GPP TS 29.272 [RFC 5516]
Cancel-Location-Answer	CLA	317	3GPP TS 29.272 [RFC 5516]
Authentication-Information-Request	AIR	318	3GPP TS 29.272 [RFC 5516]
Authentication-Information-Answer	AIA	318	3GPP TS 29.272 [RFC 5516]
Insert-Subscriber-Data-Request	IDR	319	3GPP TS 29.272 [RFC 5516]
Insert-Subscriber-Data-Answer	IDA	319	3GPP TS 29.272 [RFC 5516]
Delete-Subscriber-Data-Request	DSR	320	3GPP TS 29.272 [RFC 5516]
Delete-Subscriber-Data-Answer	DSA	320	3GPP TS 29.272 [RFC 5516]
Purge-UE-Request	PER	321	3GPP TS 29.272 [RFC 5516]
Purge-UE-Answer	PEA	321	3GPP TS 29.272 [RFC 5516]
Notify-Request	NR	323	3GPP TS 29.272 [RFC 5516]
Notify-Answer	NA	323	3GPP TS 29.272 [RFC 5516]
Provide-Location-Request	PLR	8388620	3GPP-LCS-SLg (Application-ID 16777255)
Provide-Location-Answer	PLA	8388620	3GPP-LCS-SLg (Application-ID 16777255)
Routing-Info-Request	RIR	8388622	3GPP-LCS-SLh (Application-ID 16777291)
Routing-Info-Answer	RIA	8388622	3GPP-LCS-SLh (Application-ID 16777291)
AA-Mobile-Node-Request	AMR	260	Diameter Mobile IPv4 - RFC 4004
AA-Mobile-Node-Answer	AMA	260	Diameter Mobile IPv4 - RFC 4004
Home-Agent-MIP-Request	HAR	262	Diameter Mobile IPv4 - RFC 4004
Home-Agent-MIP-Answer	HAA	262	Diameter Mobile IPv4 - RFC 4004
Configuration-Information-Request	CIR	8388718	S6t per 3GPP TS 29.336
Configuration-Information-Answer	CIA	8388718	S6t per 3GPP TS 29.336
Reporting-Information-Request	RIR	8388719	S6t per 3GPP TS 29.336
Reporting-Information-Answer	RIA	8388719	S6t per 3GPP TS 29.336
NIDD-Information-Request	NIR	8388726	S6t per 3GPP TS 29.336
NIDD-Information-Answer	NIA	8388726	S6t per 3GPP TS 29.336

=== Application-ID ===
Application-ID is used to identify for which Diameter application the message is applicable. The application can be an authentication application, an accounting application, or a vendor-specific application.

Diameter agents conforming to a certain Diameter extension publicize its support by including a specific value of in the Auth-Application-ID Attribute of the Capabilities-Exchange-Request (CER) and Capabilities-Exchange-Answer (CEA) command.

The value of the Application-ID field in the header is the same as any relevant Application-ID AVPs contained in the message. For instance, the value of the Application-ID and of the Auth-Application-ID Attribute in the Credit-Control-Request (CCR) and Credit-Control-Answer (CCA) Command for the Diameter Credit-Control Application is 4.

Application-ID	Abbr.	Full name	Usage
0	Base	Diameter Common Messages	Diameter protocol association establishment/teardown/maintenance
16777216	Cx/Dx	3GPP Cx/Dx	IMS I/S-CSCF to HSS interface
16777217	Sh	3GPP Sh	VoIP/IMS SIP Application Server to HSS interface
16777236	Rx	3GPP Rx	Policy and charging control
16777238	Gx	3GPP Gx	Policy and charging control
16777251	S6a/S6d	3GPP S6a/S6d	LTE Roaming signaling
16777252	S13	3GPP 13	Interface between EIR and MME
16777255	SLg	3GPP LCS SLg	Location services
16777345	S6t	3GPP S6t	Interface between SCEF and HSS

=== Hop-by-Hop Identifier ===
The Hop-by-Hop Identifier is an unsigned 32-bit integer field (in network byte order) that is used to match the requests with their answers as the same value in the request is used in the response.

The Diameter protocol requires that relaying and proxying agents maintain transaction state, which is used for failover purposes. Transaction state implies that upon forwarding a request, its Hop-by-Hop Identifier is saved; the field is replaced with a locally unique identifier, which is restored to its original value when the corresponding answer is received. The request's state is released upon receipt of the answer. Received answers that do not match a known Hop-by-Hop Identifier are ignored by the Diameter agent.

In case of redirecting agents, the Hop-by-Hop Identifier is maintained in the header as the Diameter agent responds with an answer message.

=== End-to-End Identifier ===
The End-to-End Identifier is an unsigned 32-bit integer field (in network byte order) that is used to detect duplicate messages along with the combination of the Origin-Host AVP.

When creating a request, the End-to-End Identifier is set to a locally unique value. The End-to-End Identifier is not modified by Diameter agents of any kind, and the same value in the corresponding request is used in the answer.

=== Attribute–Value Pairs (AVP) ===
AVP Header
Bit offset	0	1	2	3	4	5	6	7	8	9	10	11	12	13	14	15	16	17	18	19	20	21	22	23	24	25	26	27	28	29	30	31
0	AVP code																															
32	V	M	P						AVP length																							
64	vendor ID (optional)																															
96...	data...																															

For simplicity, AVP Flag "V" bit Means Vendor Specific; "M" bit means Mandatory; "P" bit means Protected.

The "V" bit, known as the Vendor-Specific bit, indicates whether the optional Vendor-ID field is present in the AVP header. When set the AVP Code belongs to the specific vendor code address space.

The "M" bit, known as the Mandatory bit, indicates whether support of the AVP is required. If an AVP with the "M" bit set is received by a Diameter client, server, proxy, or translation agent and either the AVP or its value is unrecognized, the message must be rejected. Diameter Relay and redirect agents must not reject messages with unrecognized AVPs.

The "P" bit indicates the need for encryption for end-to-end security.

Attribute-Name	Code	Data Type
Acct-Interim-Interval	85	Unsigned32
Accounting-Realtime-Required	483	Enumerated
Acct-Multi-Session-Id	50	UTF8String
Accounting-Record-Number	485	Unsigned32
Accounting-Record-Type	480	Enumerated
Accounting-Session-Id	44	OctetString
Accounting-Sub-Session-Id	287	Unsigned64
Acct-Application-Id	259	Unsigned32
Auth-Application-Id	258	Unsigned32
Auth-Request-Type	274	Enumerated
Authorization-Lifetime	291	Unsigned32
Auth-Grace-Period	276	Unsigned32
Auth-Session-State	277	Enumerated
Re-Auth-Request-Type	285	Enumerated
Class	25	OctetString
Destination-Host	293	DiamIdent
Destination-Realm	283	DiamIdent
Disconnect-Cause	273	Enumerated
E2E-Sequence	300	Grouped
Error-Message	281	UTF8String
Error-Reporting-Host	294	DiamIdent
Event-Timestamp	55	Time
Experimental-Result	297	Grouped
Experimental-Result-Code	298	Unsigned32
Failed-AVP	279	Grouped
Firmware-Revision	267	Unsigned32
Host-IP-Address	257	Address
Inband-Security-Id	299	Unsigned32
Multi-Round-Time-Out	272	Unsigned32
Origin-Host	264	DiamIdent
Origin-Realm	296	DiamIdent
Origin-State-Id	278	Unsigned32
Product-Name	269	UTF8String
Proxy-Host	280	DiamIdent
Proxy-Info	284	Grouped
Proxy-State	33	OctetString
Redirect-Host	292	DiamURI
Redirect-Host-Usage	261	Enumerated
Redirect-Max-Cache-Time	262	Unsigned32
Result-Code	268	Unsigned32
Route-Record	282	DiamIdent
Session-Id	263	UTF8String
Session-Timeout	27	Unsigned32
Session-Binding	270	Unsigned32
Session-Server-Failover	271	Enumerated
Supported-Vendor-Id	265	Unsigned32
Termination-Cause	295	Enumerated
User-Name	1	UTF8String
Vendor-Id	266	Unsigned32
Vendor-Specific-Application-Id	260	Grouped

=== State machines ===
The RFC 3588 defines a core state machine for maintaining connections between peers and processing messages. This is part of the basic protocol functionality and all stacks should support it and as such abstract from the connectivity related operations.

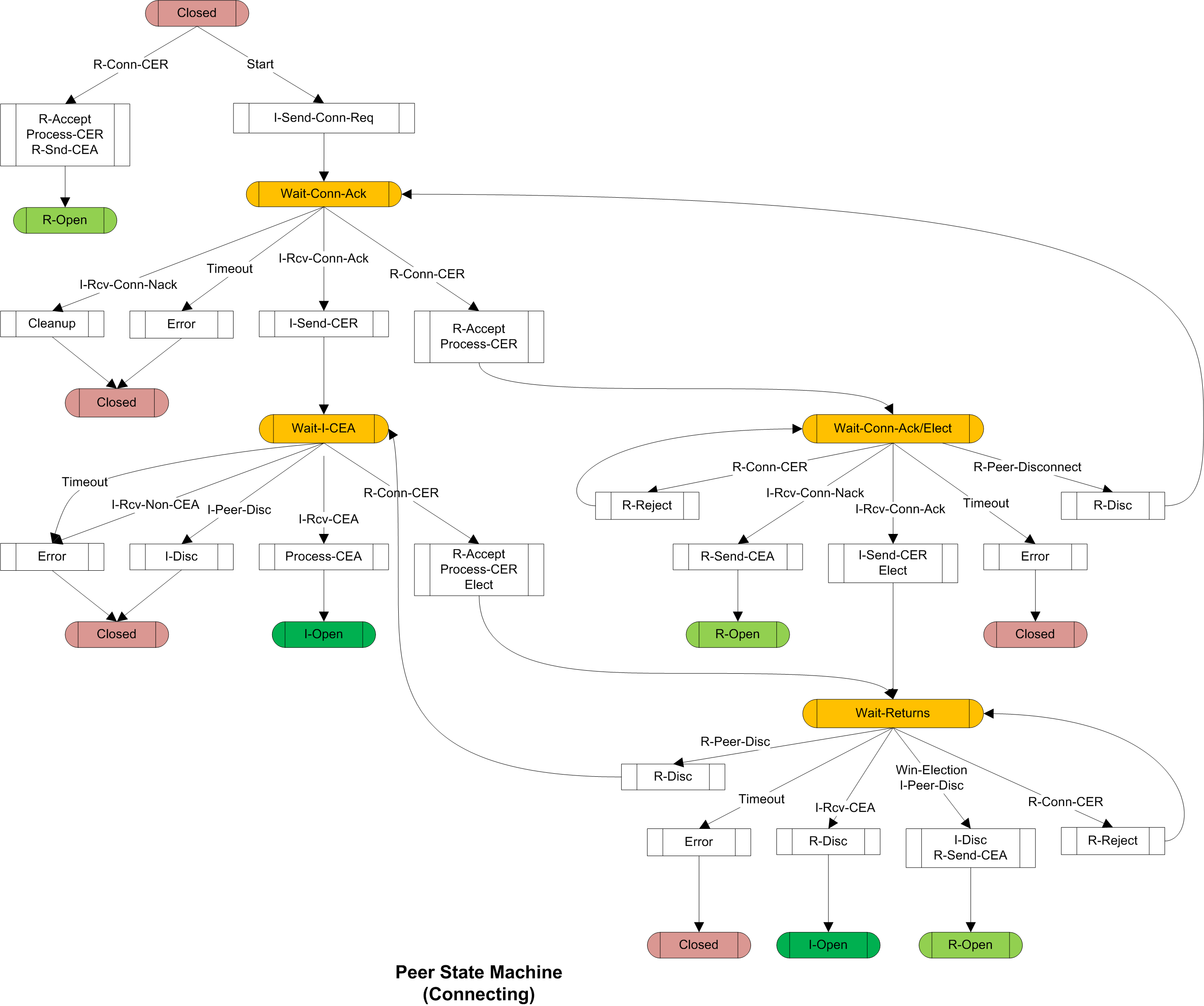
Peer State Machine Part 1

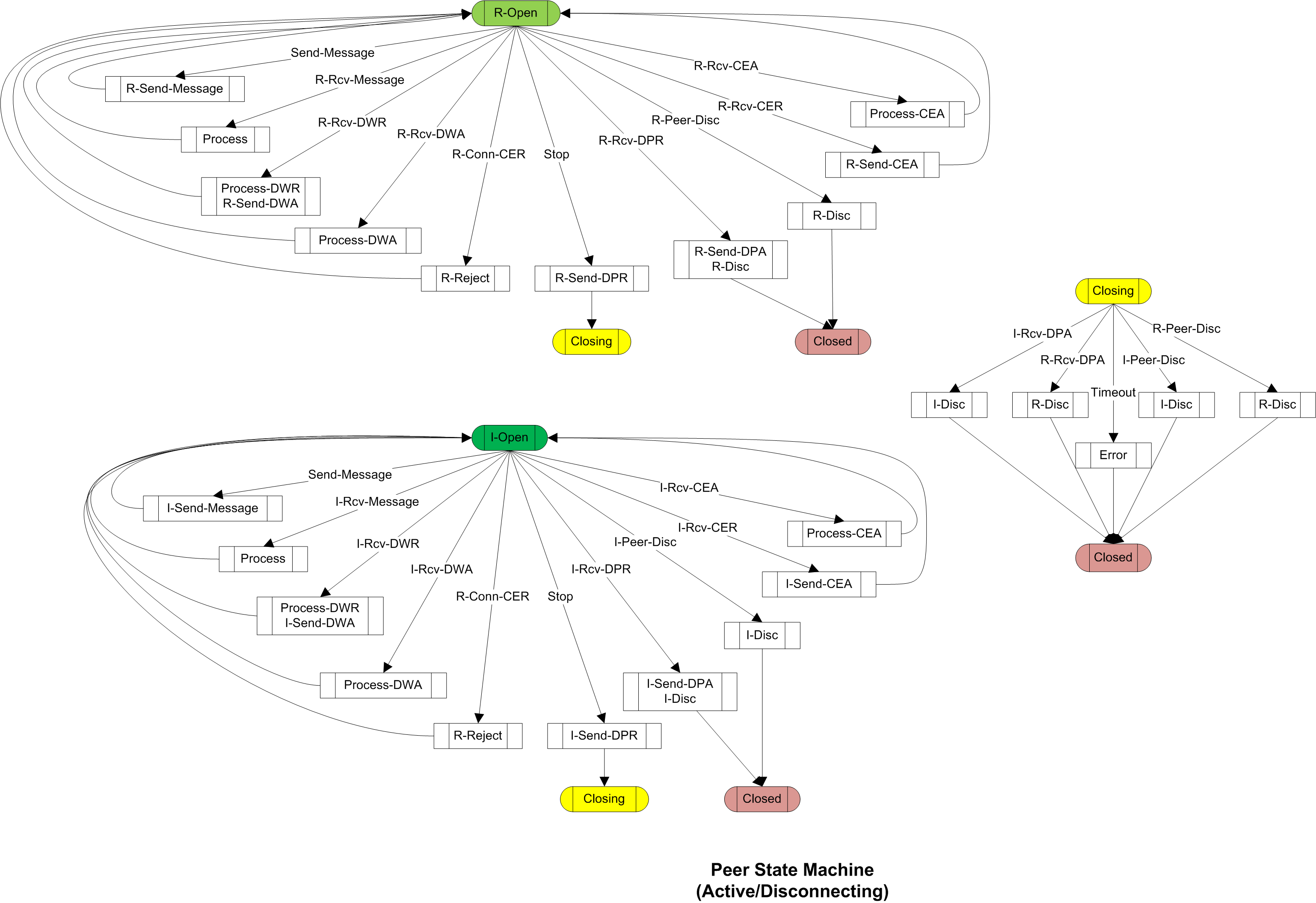
Peer State Machine Part 2

Additionally, application specific state machines can be introduced either later or at a higher abstraction layer. The RFC 3588 defines an authorization and an accounting state machine.

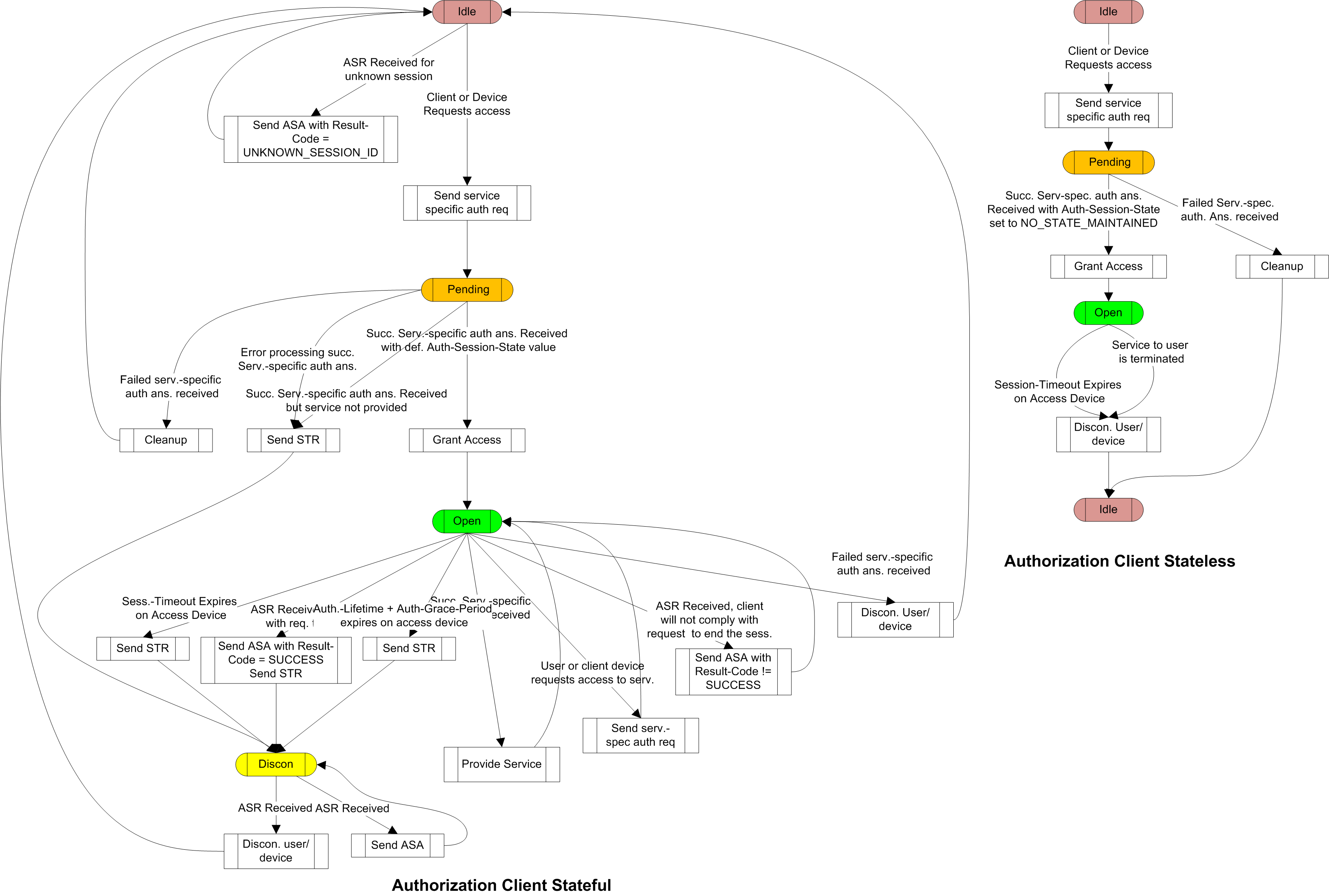
Diameter Authorization State Machines (Client)

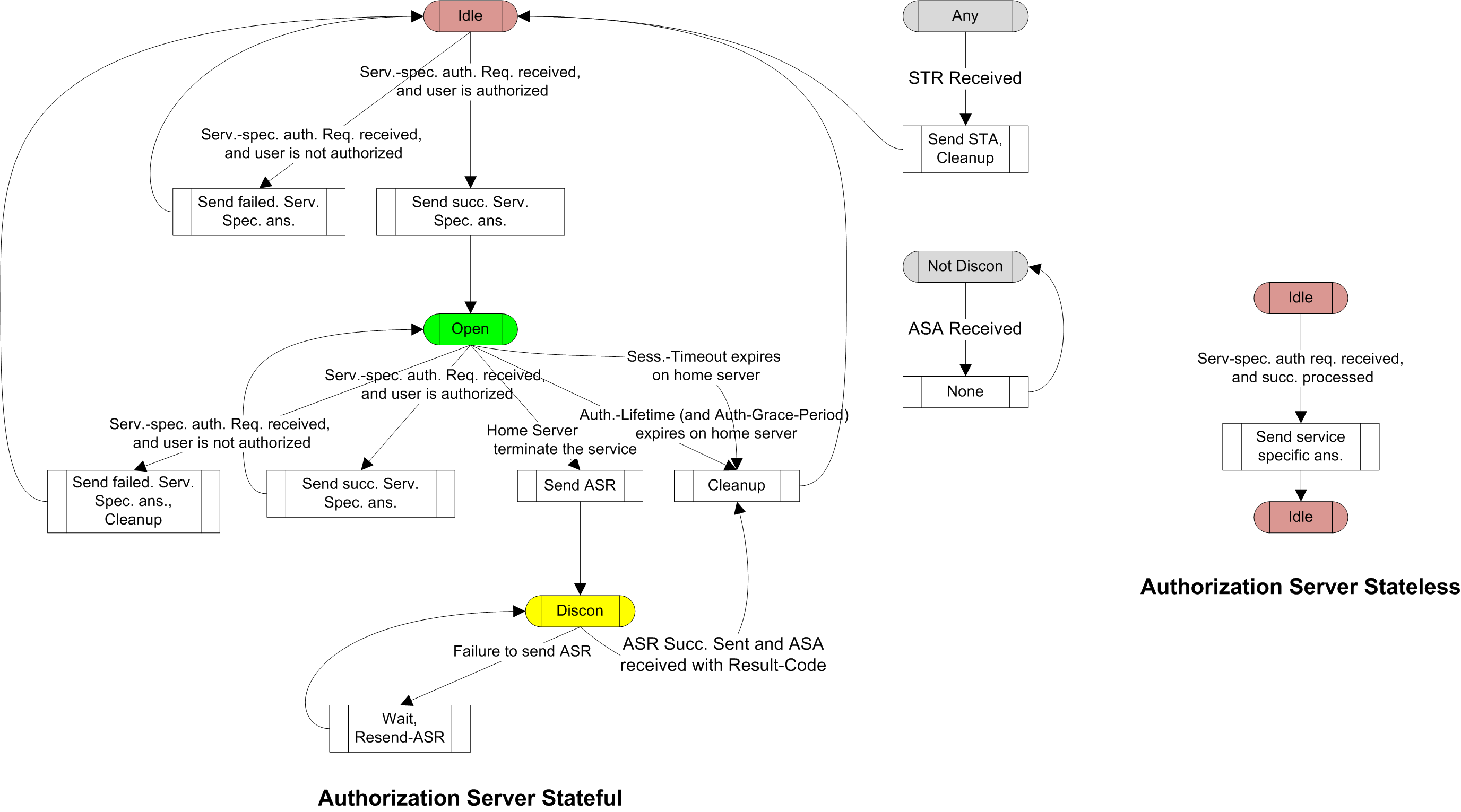
Diameter Authorization State Machines (Server)

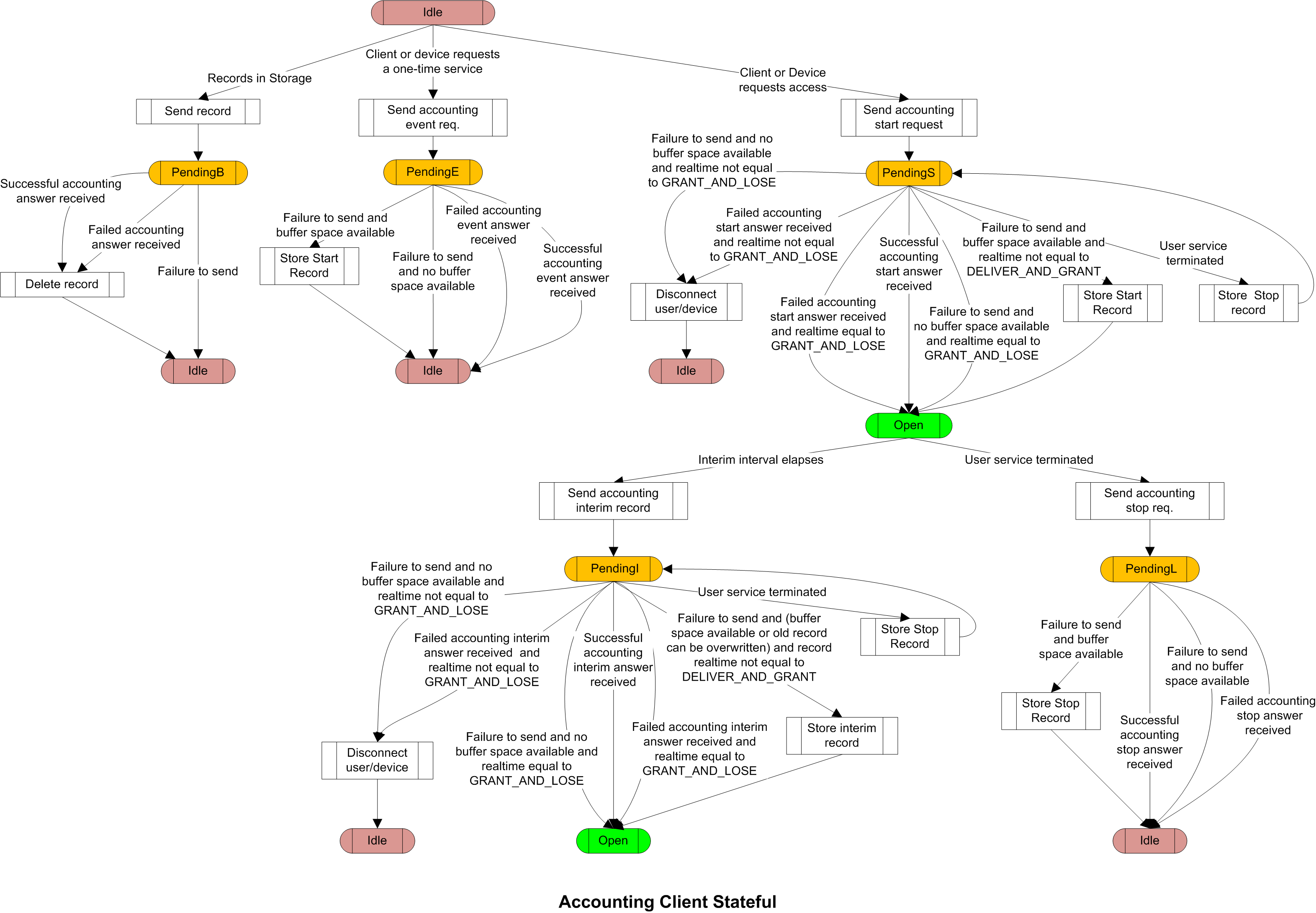
Diameter Accounting State Machines (Client)

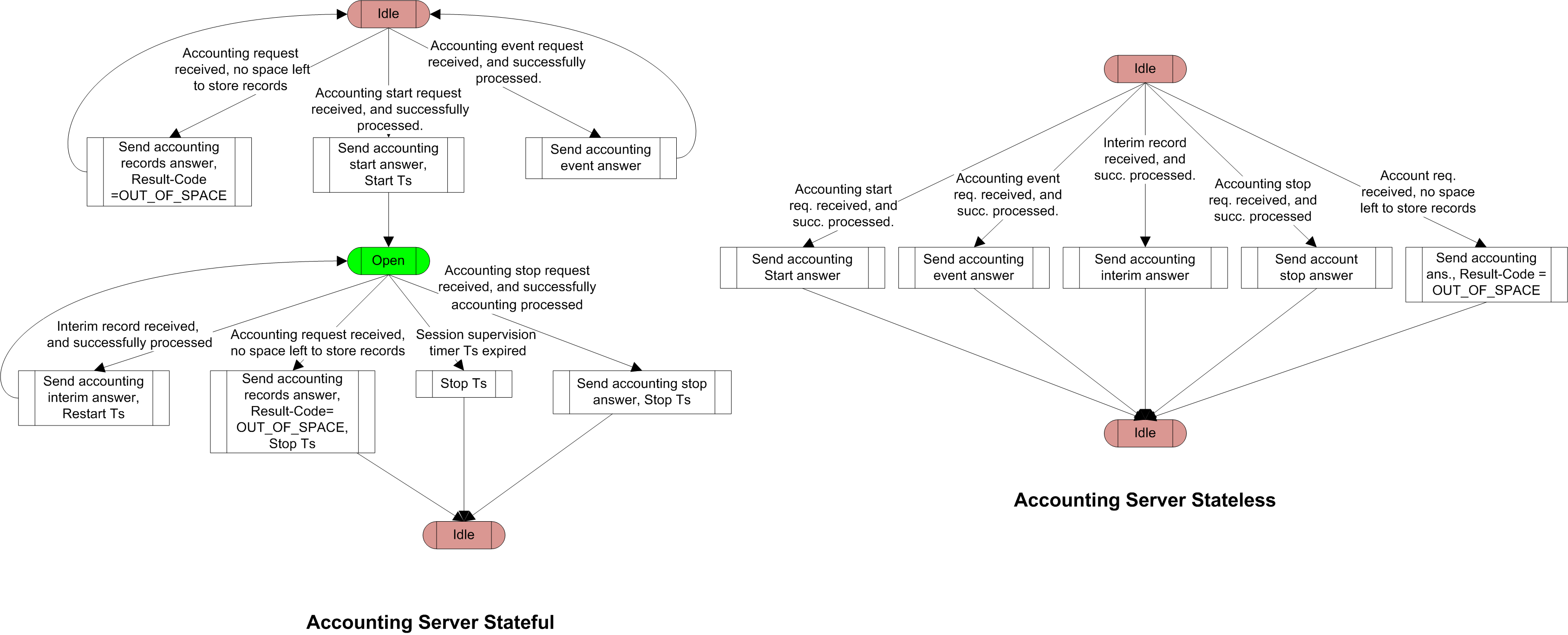
Diameter Accounting State Machines (Server)

=== Message flows ===
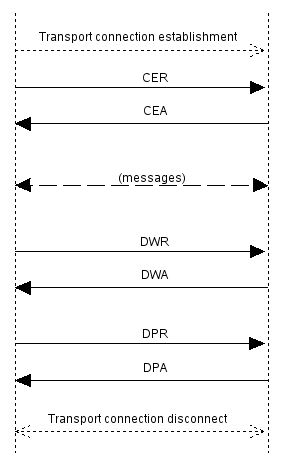

The communication between two diameter peers starts with the establishment of a transport connection (TCP or SCTP). The initiator then sends a Capabilities-Exchange-Request (CER) to the other peer, which responds with a Capabilities-Exchange-Answer (CEA). For RFC3588 compliant peers TLS (Transport Layer Security) may optionally be negotiated. For RFC6733 compliant peers TLS negotiation may optionally happen before the CER/CEA.

The connection is then ready for exchanging application messages.

If no messages have been exchanged for some time either side may send a Device-Watchdog-Request (DWR) and the other peer must respond with Device-Watchdog-Answer.

Either side may terminate the communication by sending a Disconnect-Peer-Request (DPR) which the other peer must respond to with Disconnect-Peer-Answer. After that the transport connection can be disconnected.

== RFCs ==
The Diameter protocol is currently defined in the following IETF RFCs: Obsolete RFCs are indicated with strikethrough text.

#	Title	Date published	Obsoleted by
~~RFC 3588~~	~~Diameter Base Protocol.~~	~~September 2003~~	RFC 6733
RFC 3589	Diameter Command Codes for Third Generation Partnership Project (3GPP) Release 5.	September 2003	
RFC 4004	Diameter Mobile IPv4 Application.	August 2005	
~~RFC 4005~~	~~Diameter Network Access Server Application.~~	~~August 2005~~	RFC 7155
~~RFC 4006~~	~~Diameter Credit-Control Application.~~	~~August 2005~~	RFC 8506
RFC 4072	Diameter Extensible Authentication Protocol (EAP) Application.	August 2005	
RFC 4740	Diameter Session Initiation Protocol (SIP) Application. M.	November 2006	
RFC 5224	Diameter Policy Processing Application.	March 2008	
RFC 5431	Diameter ITU-T Rw Policy Enforcement Interface Application.	March 2009	
RFC 5447	Diameter Mobile IPv6: Support for Network Access Server to Diameter Server Interaction.	February 2009	
RFC 5516	Diameter Command Code Registration for the Third Generation Partnership Project (3GPP) Evolved Packet System (EPS).	April 2009	
RFC 5624	Quality of Service Parameters for Usage with Diameter.	August 2009	
~~RFC 5719~~	~~Updated IANA Considerations for Diameter Command Code Allocations.~~	~~January 2010~~	RFC 6733
RFC 6733	Diameter Base Protocol.	October 2012	
RFC 6737	The Diameter Capabilities Update Application.	October 2012	
RFC 7155	Diameter Network Access Server Application.	April 2014	
RFC 8506	Diameter Credit-Control Application	March 2019	

== See also ==
- List of authentication protocols
- Host Identity Protocol (HIP)
