= CCMP =

CCMP or ccmp may refer to:

- CCMP (cryptography), an encryption protocol used in Wi-Fi
- CCMP Capital, a private equity investment firm
- cyclic CMP (cCMP), a cyclic nucleotide
