= RSNA =

RSNA may refer to:

- Radiological Society of North America
- Robust Security Network Association
