= Simultaneous Authentication of Equals =

Password-based authentication method

In cryptography, Simultaneous Authentication of Equals (SAE) is a password-based authentication and password-authenticated key agreement method.

== Authentication ==
SAE is a variant of the Dragonfly Key Exchange defined in RFC 7664, based on Diffie–Hellman key exchange using finite cyclic groups which can be a primary cyclic group or an elliptic curve. The problem of using Diffie–Hellman key exchange is that it does not have an authentication mechanism. So the resulting key is influenced by a pre-shared key and the MAC addresses of both peers to solve the authentication problem.

== Use ==
=== IEEE 802.11s ===
SAE was originally implemented for use between peers in IEEE 802.11s. When peers discover each other (and security is enabled) they take part in an SAE exchange. If SAE completes successfully, each peer knows the other party possesses the mesh password and, as a by-product of the SAE exchange, the two peers establish a cryptographically strong key. This key is used with the "Authenticated Mesh Peering Exchange" (AMPE) to establish a secure peering and derive a session key to protect mesh traffic, including routing traffic.

=== WPA3 ===
In January 2018, the Wi-Fi Alliance announced WPA3 as a replacement to WPA2. The new standard uses 128-bit encryption in WPA3-Personal mode (192-bit in WPA3-Enterprise) and forward secrecy. The WPA3 standard also replaces the pre-shared key (PSK) exchange with Simultaneous Authentication of Equals as defined in IEEE 802.11-2016 resulting in a more secure initial key exchange in personal mode. The Wi-Fi Alliance also claims that WPA3 will mitigate security issues posed by weak passwords and simplify the process of setting up devices with no display interface.

== Security ==
In 2019 Eyal Ronen and Mathy Vanhoef (co-author of the KRACK attack) released an analysis of WPA3's Dragonfly handshake and found that "an attacker within range of a victim can still recover the password" and the bugs found "allow an adversary to impersonate any user, and thereby access the Wi-Fi network, without knowing the user's password."

== See also ==
- Extensible Authentication Protocol (EAP)
- Key-agreement protocol
- KRACK
- IEEE 802.1X
