= CCMP (cryptography) =

Authenticated encryption protocol for Wireless LAN

Counter Mode Cipher Block Chaining Message Authentication Code Protocol (Counter Mode CBC-MAC Protocol) or CCM mode Protocol (CCMP) is an authenticated encryption protocol designed for Wireless LAN products that implement the standards of the IEEE 802.11i amendment to the original IEEE 802.11 standard. CCMP is a data cryptographic encapsulation mechanism designed for data confidentiality, integrity and authentication. It is based upon the Counter Mode with CBC-MAC (CCM mode) of the Advanced Encryption Standard (AES) standard. It was created to address the vulnerabilities presented by Wired Equivalent Privacy (WEP), a dated, insecure protocol.

== Technical details ==
CCMP uses CCM that combines CTR mode for data confidentiality and cipher block chaining message authentication code (CBC-MAC) for authentication and integrity. CCM protects the integrity of both the MPDU data field and selected portions of the IEEE 802.11 MPDU header. CCMP is based on AES processing and uses a 128-bit key and a 128-bit block size. CCMP uses CCM with the following two parameters:

- M = 8; indicating that the MIC is 8 octets (eight bytes).
- L = 2; indicating that the Length field is 2 octets.

A CCMP Medium Access Control Protocol Data Unit (MPDU) comprises five sections. The first is the MAC header which contains the destination and source address of the data packet. The second is the CCMP header which is composed of 8 octets and consists of the packet number (PN), the Ext IV, and the key ID. The packet number is a 48-bit number stored across 6 octets. The PN codes are the first two and last four octets of the CCMP header and are incremented for each subsequent packet. Between the PN codes are a reserved octet and a Key ID octet. The Key ID octet contains the Ext IV (bit 5), Key ID (bits 6–7), and a reserved subfield (bits 0–4). CCMP uses these values to encrypt the data unit and the MIC. The third section is the data unit which is the data being sent in the packet. The fourth is the message integrity code (MIC) which protects the integrity and authenticity of the packet. Finally, the fifth is the frame check sequence (FCS) which is used for error detection and correction. Of these sections only the data unit and MIC are encrypted.

== Security ==
CCMP is the standard encryption protocol for use with the Wi-Fi Protected Access II (WPA2) standard and is much more secure than the Wired Equivalent Privacy (WEP) protocol and Temporal Key Integrity Protocol (TKIP) of Wi-Fi Protected Access (WPA). CCMP provides the following security services:

- Data confidentiality; ensures only authorized parties can access the information
- Authentication; provides proof of genuineness of the user
- Access control in conjunction with layer management

Because CCMP is a block cipher mode using a 128-bit key, it is secure against attacks to the 2^{64} steps of operation. Generic meet-in-the-middle attacks do exist and can be used to limit the theoretical strength of the key to 2^{n/2} (where n is the number of bits in the key) operations needed.
