= IP fragmentation attack =

Cyberattack method based on Internet Protocol fragmentation

IP fragmentation attacks are a kind of computer security attack based on how the Internet Protocol (IP) requires data to be transmitted and processed. Specifically, it invokes IP fragmentation, a process used to partition messages (the service data unit (SDU); typically a packet) from one layer of a network into multiple smaller payloads that can fit within the lower layer's protocol data unit (PDU). Every network link has a maximum size of messages that may be transmitted, called the maximum transmission unit (MTU). If the SDU plus metadata added at the link layer exceeds the MTU, the SDU must be fragmented. IP fragmentation attacks exploit this process as an attack vector.

Part of the TCP/IP suite is the Internet Protocol (IP) which resides at the Internet Layer of this model. IP is responsible for the transmission of packets between network end points. IP includes some features which provide basic measures of fault-tolerance (time to live, checksum), traffic prioritization (type of service) and support for the fragmentation of larger packets into multiple smaller packets (ID field, fragment offset). The support for fragmentation of larger packets provides a protocol allowing routers to fragment a packet into smaller packets when the original packet is too large for the supporting datalink frames. IP fragmentation exploits (attacks) use the fragmentation protocol within IP as an attack vector.

According to [Kurose 2013], in one type of IP fragmentation attack "the attacker sends a stream of small fragments to the target host, none of which has an offset of zero. The target can collapse as it attempts to rebuild datagrams out of the degenerate packets." Another attack involves sending overlapping fragments with non-aligned offsets, which can render vulnerable operating systems not knowing what to do, causing some to crash.

== Process ==
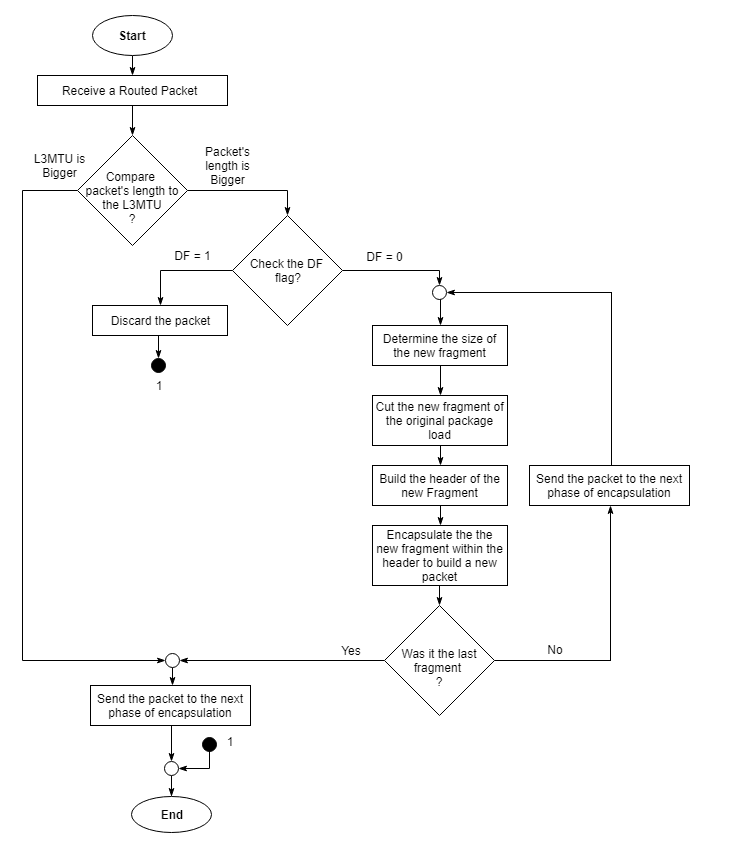
The fragmentation algorithm in IPv4.

IP packets are encapsulated in datalink frames, and, therefore, the link MTU affects larger IP packets and forces them to be split into pieces equal to or smaller than the MTU size.

This can be accomplished by several approaches:

- To set the IP packet size equal or smaller than the directly attached medium and delegate all further fragmentation of packets to routers, meaning that routers decide if the current packet should be re-fragmented or not. This offloads a lot of work on to routers, and can also result in packets being segmented by several IP routers one after another, resulting in very peculiar fragmentation.
- To preview all links between source and destination and select the smallest MTU in this route, assuming there is a unique route. This way we make sure that the fragmentation is done by the sender, using a packet-size smaller than the selected MTU, and there is no further fragmentation en route. This solution, called Path MTU Discovery, allows a sender to fragment/segment a long Internet packet, rather than relying on routers to perform IP-level fragmentation. This is more efficient and more scalable. It is therefore the recommended method in the current Internet. The problem with this approach is that each packet is routed independently; they may well typically follow the same route, but they may not, and so a probe packet to determine fragmentation may follow a path different from paths taken by later packets.

Three fields in the IP header are used to implement fragmentation and reassembly. The "Identification", "Flags" and "Fragment Offset" fields.

IPv4 Header Format
Offsets	Octet	0								1								2								3							
Octet	Bit	0	1	2	3	4	5	6	7	8	9	10	11	12	13	14	15	16	17	18	19	20	21	22	23	24	25	26	27	28	29	30	31
0	0	Version				IHL				DSCP						ECN		Total Length															
4	32	Identification																Flags			Fragment Offset												
8	64	Time To Live								Protocol								Header Checksum															
12	96	Source IP Address																															
16	128	Destination IP Address																															
20	160	Options (if IHL > 5)																															
24	192	Options (if IHL > 5)																															
28	224	Options (if IHL > 5)																															
32	256	Options (if IHL > 5)																															

Flags:

A 3 bit field which says if the packet is a part of a fragmented data frame or not.

Bit 0: reserved, must be zero (unless packet is adhering to RFC 3514)
Bit 1: (AF) 0 = May Fragment, 1 = Don't Fragment.
Bit 2: (AF) 0 = Last Fragment, 1 = More Fragments.

Bit	0	1	2	3	4	5	6	7	8	9	10	11	12	13	14	15
Field	0	DF	MF	Fragment Offset												

Fragment Offset specifies the fragment's position within the original packet, measured in 8-byte units.

Accordingly, every fragment except the last must contain a multiple of 8 bytes of data. It is obvious that Fragment Offset can hold 8192 (2^13) units but the packet can't have 8192 * 8 = 65,536 bytes of data because "Total Length" field of IP header records the total size including the header and data. An IP header is at least 20 bytes long, so the maximum value for "Fragment Offset" is restricted to 8189, which leaves room for 3 bytes in the last fragment.

Because an IP internet can be connectionless, fragments from one packet may be interleaved with those from another at the destination. The "Identification field" uniquely identifies the fragments of a particular packet.

The source system sets "Identification" field in each packet to a unique value for all packets which use the same source IP address, destination IP address, and "Protocol" values, for the lifetime of the packet on the internet. This way the destination can distinguish which incoming fragments belong to a unique packet and buffer all of them until the last fragment is received. The last fragment sets the "More Fragment" bit to 0 and this tells the receiving station to start reassembling the data if all fragments have been received.

The following is a real-life fragmentation example:

The following was obtained using the Ethereal protocol analyzer to capture ICMP echo request packets. To simulate this open up a terminal and type ping ip_dest -n 1 -l 65000.

The results are as follows:

      No. Time      Source                Destination           Protocol Info
      1 0.000000    87.247.163.96         66.94.234.13          ICMP     Echo (ping) request
      2 0.000000    87.247.163.96         66.94.234.13          IP       Fragmented IP protocol (proto=ICMP 0x01, off=1480)
      3 0.002929    87.247.163.96         66.94.234.13          IP       Fragmented IP protocol (proto=ICMP 0x01, off=2960)
      4 6.111328    87.247.163.96         66.94.234.13          IP       Fragmented IP protocol (proto=ICMP 0x01, off=4440)
      5 6.123046    87.247.163.96         66.94.234.13          IP       Fragmented IP protocol (proto=ICMP 0x01, off=5920)
      6 6.130859    87.247.163.96         66.94.234.13          IP       Fragmented IP protocol (proto=ICMP 0x01, off=7400)
      7 6.170898    87.247.163.96         66.94.234.13          IP       Fragmented IP protocol (proto=ICMP 0x01, off=8880)
      8 6.214843    87.247.163.96         66.94.234.13          IP       Fragmented IP protocol (proto=ICMP 0x01, off=10360)
      9 6.239257    87.247.163.96         66.94.234.13          IP       Fragmented IP protocol (proto=ICMP 0x01, off=11840)
     10 6.287109    87.247.163.96         66.94.234.13          IP       Fragmented IP protocol (proto=ICMP 0x01, off=13320)
     11 6.302734    87.247.163.96         66.94.234.13          IP       Fragmented IP protocol (proto=ICMP 0x01, off=14800)
     12 6.327148    87.247.163.96         66.94.234.13          IP       Fragmented IP protocol (proto=ICMP 0x01, off=16280)
     13 6.371093    87.247.163.96         66.94.234.13          IP       Fragmented IP protocol (proto=ICMP 0x01, off=17760)
     14 6.395507    87.247.163.96         66.94.234.13          IP       Fragmented IP protocol (proto=ICMP 0x01, off=19240)
     15 6.434570    87.247.163.96         66.94.234.13          IP       Fragmented IP protocol (proto=ICMP 0x01, off=20720)
     16 6.455078    87.247.163.96         66.94.234.13          IP       Fragmented IP protocol (proto=ICMP 0x01, off=22200)
     17 6.531250    87.247.163.96         66.94.234.13          IP       Fragmented IP protocol (proto=ICMP 0x01, off=23680)
     18 6.550781    87.247.163.96         66.94.234.13          IP       Fragmented IP protocol (proto=ICMP 0x01, off=25160)
     19 6.575195    87.247.163.96         66.94.234.13          IP       Fragmented IP protocol (proto=ICMP 0x01, off=26640)
     20 6.615234    87.247.163.96         66.94.234.13          IP       Fragmented IP protocol (proto=ICMP 0x01, off=28120)
     21 6.634765    87.247.163.96         66.94.234.13          IP       Fragmented IP protocol (proto=ICMP 0x01, off=29600)
     22 6.659179    87.247.163.96         66.94.234.13          IP       Fragmented IP protocol (proto=ICMP 0x01, off=31080)
     23 6.682617    87.247.163.96         66.94.234.13          IP       Fragmented IP protocol (proto=ICMP 0x01, off=32560)
     24 6.699218    87.247.163.96         66.94.234.13          IP       Fragmented IP protocol (proto=ICMP 0x01, off=34040)
     25 6.743164    87.247.163.96         66.94.234.13          IP       Fragmented IP protocol (proto=ICMP 0x01, off=35520)
     26 6.766601    87.247.163.96         66.94.234.13          IP       Fragmented IP protocol (proto=ICMP 0x01, off=37000)
     27 6.783203    87.247.163.96         66.94.234.13          IP       Fragmented IP protocol (proto=ICMP 0x01, off=38480)
     28 6.806640    87.247.163.96         66.94.234.13          IP       Fragmented IP protocol (proto=ICMP 0x01, off=39960)
     29 6.831054    87.247.163.96         66.94.234.13          IP       Fragmented IP protocol (proto=ICMP 0x01, off=41440)
     30 6.850586    87.247.163.96         66.94.234.13          IP       Fragmented IP protocol (proto=ICMP 0x01, off=42920)
     31 6.899414    87.247.163.96         66.94.234.13          IP       Fragmented IP protocol (proto=ICMP 0x01, off=44400)
     32 6.915039    87.247.163.96         66.94.234.13          IP       Fragmented IP protocol (proto=ICMP 0x01, off=45880)
     33 6.939453    87.247.163.96         66.94.234.13          IP       Fragmented IP protocol (proto=ICMP 0x01, off=47360)
     34 6.958984    87.247.163.96         66.94.234.13          IP       Fragmented IP protocol (proto=ICMP 0x01, off=48840)
     35 6.983398    87.247.163.96         66.94.234.13          IP       Fragmented IP protocol (proto=ICMP 0x01, off=50320)
     36 7.023437    87.247.163.96         66.94.234.13          IP       Fragmented IP protocol (proto=ICMP 0x01, off=51800)
     37 7.046875    87.247.163.96         66.94.234.13          IP       Fragmented IP protocol (proto=ICMP 0x01, off=53280)
     38 7.067382    87.247.163.96         66.94.234.13          IP       Fragmented IP protocol (proto=ICMP 0x01, off=54760)
     39 7.090820    87.247.163.96         66.94.234.13          IP       Fragmented IP protocol (proto=ICMP 0x01, off=56240)
     40 7.130859    87.247.163.96         66.94.234.13          IP       Fragmented IP protocol (proto=ICMP 0x01, off=57720)
     41 7.151367    87.247.163.96         66.94.234.13          IP       Fragmented IP protocol (proto=ICMP 0x01, off=59200)
     42 7.174804    87.247.163.96         66.94.234.13          IP       Fragmented IP protocol (proto=ICMP 0x01, off=60680)
     43 7.199218    87.247.163.96         66.94.234.13          IP       Fragmented IP protocol (proto=ICMP 0x01, off=62160)
     44 7.214843    87.247.163.96         66.94.234.13          IP       Fragmented IP protocol (proto=ICMP 0x01, off=63640)
     45 7.258789    87.247.163.96         66.94.234.13          IP       Fragmented IP protocol (proto=ICMP 0x01, off=65120)

The first packet details:
      No.Time        Source                Destination          Protocol Info
      1 0.000000    87.247.163.96         66.94.234.13          ICMP     Echo (ping) request

Frame 1 (1514 bytes on wire, 1514 bytes captured)
Ethernet II, Src: OmronTat_00:00:00 (00:00:0a:00:00:00), Dst: 40:0f:20:00:0c:00 (40:0f:20:00:0c:00)
Internet Protocol, Src: 87.247.163.96 (87.247.163.96), Dst: 66.94.234.13 (66.94.234.13)
Internet Control Message Protocol
    Type: 8 (Echo (ping) request)
    Code: 0
    Checksum: 0x6b7d
    Identifier: 0x0600
    Sequence number: 0x0200
    Data (1472 bytes)

The second packet details:
     No. Time        Source                Destination          Protocol Info
      2 0.000000    87.247.163.96         66.94.234.13          IP       Fragmented IP protocol (proto=ICMP 0x01, off=1480)

Frame 2 (1514 bytes on wire, 1514 bytes captured)
Ethernet II, Src: OmronTat_00:00:00 (00:00:0a:00:00:00), Dst: 40:0f:20:00:0c:00 (40:0f:20:00:0c:00)
Internet Protocol, Src: 87.247.163.96 (87.247.163.96), Dst: 66.94.234.13 (66.94.234.13)
Data (1480 bytes)

Note that only the first fragment contains the ICMP header and all remaining fragments are generated without the ICMP header.

Two important points here:

- In some datalink protocols such as Ethernet, only the first fragment contains the full upper layer header, meaning that other fragments look like beheaded packets.
- Additional overhead imposed over network because all fragments contains their own IP header. Additional overhead = (number_of_fragments - 1) * (ip_header_len);

== Exploits ==
IP fragment overlapped
The IP fragment overlapped exploit occurs when two fragments contained within the same IP packet have offsets that indicate that they overlap each other in positioning within the packet. This could mean that either fragment A is being completely overwritten by fragment B, or that fragment A is partially being overwritten by fragment B. Some operating systems do not properly handle fragments that overlap in this manner and may throw exceptions or behave in other undesirable ways upon receipt of overlapping fragments. This is the basis for the teardrop attack. Overlapping fragments may also be used in an attempt to bypass Intrusion Detection Systems. In this exploit, part of an attack is sent in fragments along with additional random data; future fragments may overwrite the random data with the remainder of the attack. If the completed packet is not properly reassembled at the IDS, the attack will go undetected.
IP fragmentation buffer full
The IP fragmentation buffer full exploit occurs when there is an excessive amount of incomplete fragmented traffic detected on the protected network. This could be due to an excessive number of incomplete fragmented packets, a large number of fragments for individual packets or a combination of quantity of incomplete packets and size/number of fragments in each packet. This type of traffic is most likely an attempt to bypass security measures or Intrusion Detection Systems by intentional fragmentation of attack activity.
IP fragment overrun
The IP Fragment Overrun exploit is when a reassembled fragmented packet exceeds the declared IP data length or the maximum packet length. By definition, no IP packet should be larger than 65,535 bytes. Systems that try to process these large packets can crash, and can be indicative of a denial of service attempt.
IP fragment too many packets
The "Too Many Packets" exploit is identified by an excessive number of incomplete fragmented packet detected on the network. This is usually either a denial of service attack or an attempt to bypass security measures. An example of "Too Many Packets", "Incomplete Packet" and "Fragment Too Small" is the Rose Attack.
IP fragment incomplete packet
This exploit occurs when a packet can not be fully reassembled due to missing data. This can indicate a denial of service attack or an attempt to defeat packet filter security policies.
IP Fragment Too Small
If an IP fragment is too small it indicates that the fragment is likely intentionally crafted. Any fragment other than the final fragment that is less than 400 bytes could be considered too small. Small fragments may be used in denial of service attacks or in an attempt to bypass security measures or detection.

== Fragmentation for evasion ==
Network infrastructure equipment such as routers, load-balancers, firewalls and IDS have inconsistent visibility into fragmented packets. For example, a device may subject the initial fragment to rigorous inspection and auditing, but might allow all additional fragments to pass unchecked. Some attacks may use this fact to evade detection by placing incriminating payload data in fragments. Devices operating in "full" proxy mode are generally not susceptible to this subterfuge.
