= FragAttacks =

Set of Wi-Fi vulnerabilities

- Discoverer: Mathy Vanhoef

FragAttacks, or fragmentation and aggregation attacks, are a group of Wi-Fi vulnerabilities discovered by security researcher Mathy Vanhoef. Since the vulnerabilities are design flaws in the Wi-Fi standard, any device released after 1997 could be vulnerable. The attack can be executed without special privileges. The attack was detailed in August 2021 at Black Hat Briefings USA and later at the USENIX 30th Security Symposium, where recordings are shared publicly. The attack does not leave any trace in the network logs.

FragAttacks demonstration by Mathy Vanhoef

== Patches ==
Vanhoef worked with the Wi-Fi Alliance to help vendors issue patches.

Microsoft started issuing patches for Windows 7 through Windows 10 on May 11, 2021.
