= Wireless access point =

Device that allows wireless devices to connect to a wired network

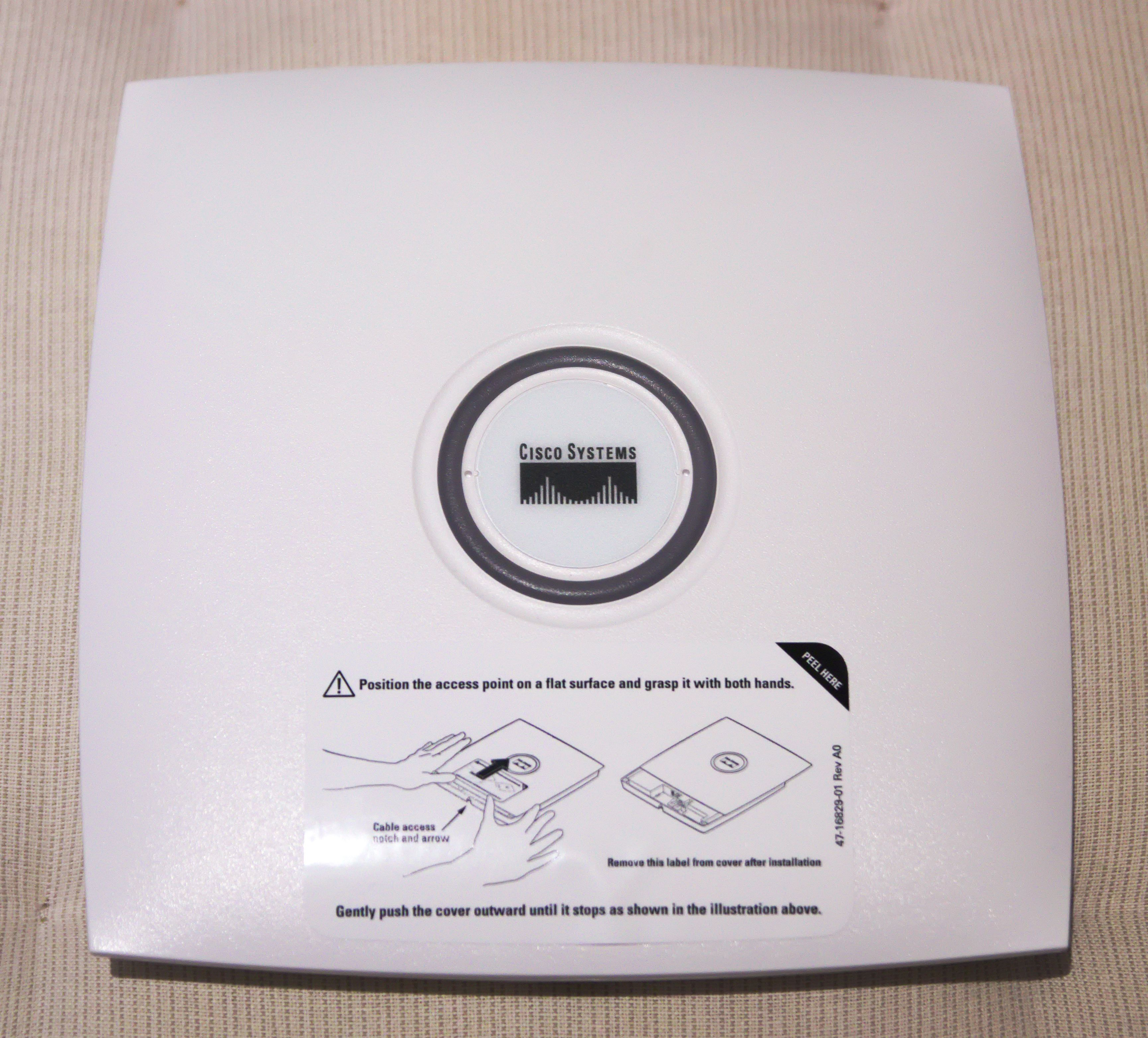
Cisco Aironet wireless access point

In computer networking, a wireless access point (WAP), also called just access point (AP), is a networking device that allows other Wi-Fi devices to connect to a wired network or wireless network. As a standalone device, the AP may have a wired or wireless connection to a switch or router, but in a wireless router it can also be an integral component of the networking device itself. A WAP and AP is differentiated from a hotspot, which can be a physical location or digital location where Wi-Fi or WAP access is available.

== Connections ==
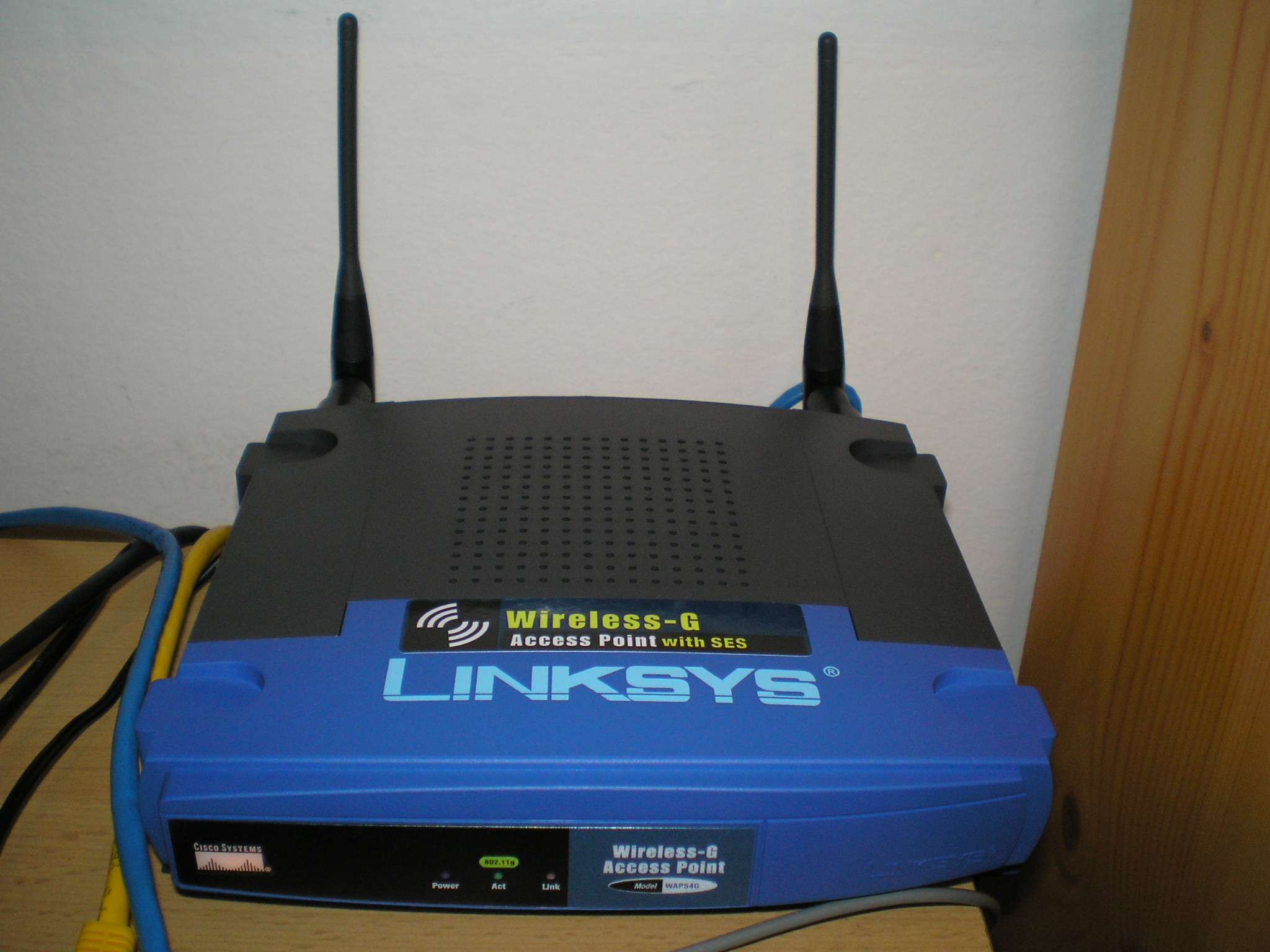
Linksys "WAP54G" 802.11g wireless router

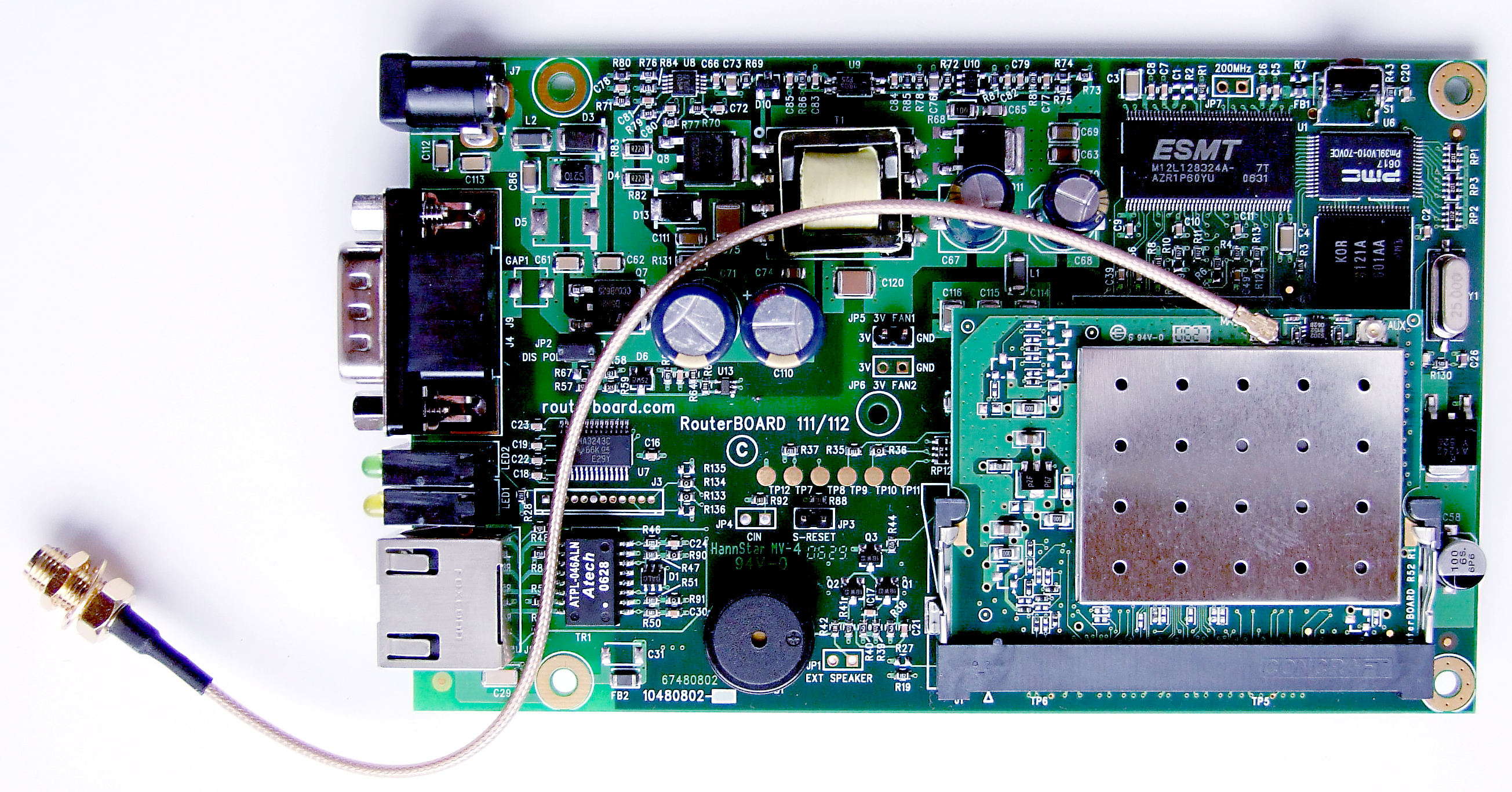
Embedded RouterBoard 112, widely used by wireless Internet service providers (WISPs) across the world, with U.FL-RSMA pigtail and R52 mini PCI Wi-Fi card

An AP connects directly to a wired local, typically Ethernet, and the AP then provides wireless connections using wireless LAN technology, typically Wi-Fi, for other devices to use that wired connection. APs support the connection of multiple wireless devices through their one wired connection.

== Wireless data standards ==
There are many wireless data standards that have been introduced for wireless access point and wireless router technology. New standards have been created to accommodate the increasing need for faster wireless connections. Access points can provide backward compatibility with older Wi-Fi protocols as many devices were manufactured for use with older standards.

- 802.11a
- 802.11b
- 802.11g
- 802.11n (Wi-Fi 4)
- 802.11ac (Wi-Fi 5)
- 802.11ax (Wi-Fi 6/6E)
- 802.11be (Wi-Fi 7)

== Wireless access point vs. ad hoc network ==
Some people confuse wireless access points with wireless ad hoc networks. An ad hoc network uses a connection between two or more devices without using a wireless access point; the devices communicate directly. Because setup is easy and does not require an access point, an ad hoc network is used in situations such as a quick data exchange or a multiplayer video game. Due to its peer-to-peer layout, ad hoc Wi-Fi connections are similar to connections available using Bluetooth.

Ad hoc connections are generally not recommended for a permanent installation. Internet access via ad hoc networks, using features like Windows' Internet Connection Sharing or dedicated software such as WiFi Direct Access Point, may work well with a small number of devices that are close to each other, but ad hoc networks do not scale well. Internet traffic will converge to the nodes with direct internet connection, potentially congesting these nodes. For internet-enabled nodes, access points have a clear advantage, with the possibility of having a wired LAN.

== Limitations ==
It is generally recommended that one IEEE 802.11 AP should have, at a maximum, 10–25 clients. However, the actual maximum number of clients that can be supported can vary significantly depending on several factors, such as type of APs in use, density of client environment, desired client throughput, etc. The range of communication can also vary significantly, depending on such variables as indoor or outdoor placement, height above ground, nearby obstructions, other electronic devices that might actively interfere with the signal by broadcasting on the same frequency, type of antenna, the current weather, operating radio frequency, and the power output of devices. Network designers can extend the range of APs through the use of repeaters, which amplify a radio signal, and reflectors, which only bounce it. In experimental conditions, wireless networking has operated over distances of several hundred kilometers.

Most jurisdictions have only a limited number of frequencies legally available for use by wireless networks. Usually, adjacent APs will use different frequencies (channels) to communicate with their clients in order to avoid interference between the two nearby systems. Wireless devices can "listen" for data traffic on other frequencies, and can rapidly switch from one frequency to another to achieve better reception. However, the limited number of frequencies becomes problematic in crowded downtown areas with tall buildings using multiple APs. In such an environment, signal overlap becomes an issue causing interference, which results in signal degradation and data errors.

Wireless networking lags wired networking in terms of increasing bandwidth and throughput. While (as of 2013) high-density 256-QAM modulation, 3-antenna wireless devices for the consumer market can reach sustained real-world speeds of some 240 Mbit/s at 13 m behind two standing walls (NLOS) depending on their nature or 360 Mbit/s at 10 m line of sight or 380 Mbit/s at 2 m line of sight (IEEE 802.11ac) or 20 to 25 Mbit/s at 2 m line of sight (IEEE 802.11g), wired hardware of similar cost reaches closer to 1000 Mbit/s up to specified distance of 100 m with twisted-pair cabling in optimal conditions (Category 5 (known as Cat-5) or better cabling with Gigabit Ethernet). One impediment to increasing the speed of wireless communications comes from Wi-Fi's use of a shared communications medium: Thus, two stations in infrastructure mode that are communicating with each other even over the same AP must have each and every frame transmitted twice: from the sender to the AP, then from the AP to the receiver. This approximately halves the effective bandwidth, so an AP is only able to use somewhat less than half the actual over-the-air rate for data throughput. Thus a typical 54 Mbit/s wireless connection actually carries TCP/IP data at 20 to 25 Mbit/s. Users of legacy wired networks expect faster speeds, and people using wireless connections keenly want to see the wireless networks catch up.

By 2012, 802.11n based access points and client devices have already taken a fair share of the marketplace and with the finalization of the 802.11n standard in 2009 inherent problems integrating products from different vendors are less prevalent.

== Security ==
Wireless access has special security considerations. Many wired networks base the security on physical access control, trusting all the users on the local network, but if wireless access points are connected to the network, anybody within range of the AP (which typically extends farther than the intended area) can attach to the network.

The most common solution is wireless traffic encryption. Modern access points come with built-in encryption. The first generation encryption scheme, WEP, proved easy to crack; the second and third generation schemes, WPA and WPA2, are considered secure if a strong enough password or passphrase is used.

Some APs support hotspot style authentication using RADIUS and other authentication servers.

Opinions about wireless network security vary widely. For example, in a 2008 article for Wired magazine, Bruce Schneier asserted the net benefits of open Wi-Fi without passwords outweigh the risks, a position supported in 2014 by Peter Eckersley of the Electronic Frontier Foundation. The opposite position was taken by Nick Mediati in an article for PC World, in which he advocates that every wireless access point should be protected with a password.

== See also ==
- Femtocell – a local-area base station using cellular network standards such as UMTS, rather than Wi-Fi
- HomePlug – wired LAN technology that has a few elements in common with Wi-Fi
- Lightweight Access Point Protocol – used to manage a large set of APs
- List of router firmware projects
- Wi-Fi Direct – a Wi-Fi standard that enables devices to connect with each other without requiring a (hardware) wireless access point and to communicate at typical Wi-Fi speeds
- WiMAX – wide-area wireless standard that has a few elements in common with Wi-Fi
- Wireless Application Protocol – Deprecated technical standard for data access over a cellular network, sometimes confused for access points, especially in mobile contexts
