= Xsupplicant =

Computer networking supplicant

- Developer: Chris Hessing
- Release: January 8, 2003
- Stable release: 2.2.0 / January 29, 2010; 16 years ago
- Preview release: 2.2.3 / January 31, 2011; 15 years ago
- Written in: C / C++
- Operating system: Linux, Windows XP, Windows Vista, and Windows 7
- Type: LAN tools
- License: GPL / BSD
- Website: open1x.sourceforge.net

Xsupplicant is a supplicant that allows a workstation to authenticate with a RADIUS server using 802.1X and the Extensible Authentication Protocol (EAP). It can be used for computers with wired or wireless LAN connections to complete a strong authentication before joining the network and supports the dynamic assignment of WEP keys.

== Overview ==
Xsupplicant up to version 1.2.8 was designed to run on Linux clients as a command line utility. Version 1.3.X and greater are designed to run on Windows XP and are currently being ported to Linux/BSD systems, and include a robust graphical user interface, and also includes network access control (NAC) functionality from Trusted Computing Group's Trusted Network Connect NAC.

Xsupplicant was chosen by the OpenSea Alliance, dedicated to developing, promoting, and distributing an open source 802.1X supplicant.

Xsupplicant supports the following EAP types:

- EAP-MD5
- LEAP
- EAP-MSCHAPv2
- EAP-OTP
- EAP-PEAP (v0 and v1)
- EAP-SIM
- EAP-TLS
- EAP-TNC
- EAP-TTLSv0 (PAP/CHAP/MS-CHAP/MS-CHAPv2/EAP)
- EAP-AKA
- EAP-GTC
- EAP-FAST (partial)

Xsupplicant is primarily maintained by Chris Hessing.

== See also ==
- wpa_supplicant
