= Wireless supplicant =

A Wireless Supplicant is a program that runs on a computer and is responsible for making login requests to a wireless network. It handles passing the login and encryption credentials to the authentication server. It also handles roaming from one wireless access point to another, in order to maintain connectivity.

== See also ==
- Supplicant
- wpa_supplicant
- Xsupplicant
