= PANA =

PANA may refer to:

- The Panafrican News Agency, based in Senegal
- A former name of the Islamic Republic News Agency, based in Iran
- The Protocol for carrying Authentication for Network Access
- PANA in telecommunications refers to a plain analog loop, also known as a dry pair or BANA (basic analog loop)
- Napakiak Airport (ICAO location indicator: PANA), in Napakiak, Alaska, United States
- Peace and Neutrality Alliance, in Ireland

== See also ==
- Pana (disambiguation)
