= Internet Authentication Service =

Component of Windows Server

Internet Authentication Service (IAS) is a component of Windows Server operating systems that provides centralized user authentication, authorization and accounting.

== Overview ==
While Routing and Remote Access Service (RRAS) security is sufficient for small networks, larger companies often need a dedicated infrastructure for authentication. RADIUS is a standard for dedicated authentication servers.

Windows 2000 Server and Windows Server 2003 include the Internet Authentication Service (IAS), an implementation of RADIUS server. IAS supports authentication for Windows-based clients, as well as for third-party clients that adhere to the RADIUS standard. IAS stores its authentication information in Active Directory, and can be managed with Remote Access Policies. IAS first showed up for Windows NT 4.0 in the Windows NT 4.0 Option Pack and in Microsoft Commercial Internet System (MCIS) 2.0 and 2.5.

While IAS requires the use of an additional server component, it provides a number of advantages over the standard methods of RRAS authentication. These advantages include centralized authentication for users, auditing and accounting features, scalability, and seamless integration with the existing features of RRAS.

In Windows Server 2008, Network Policy Server (NPS) replaces the Internet Authentication Service (IAS). NPS performs all of the functions of IAS in Windows Server 2003 for VPN and 802.1X-based wireless and wired connections and performs health evaluation and the granting of either unlimited or limited access for Network Access Protection clients.

== Logging ==
By default, IAS logs to local files (%systemroot%\LogFiles\IAS\*) though it can be configured to log to SQL as well (or in place of).

When logging to SQL, IAS appears to wrap the data into XML, then calls the stored procedure report_event, passing the XML data as text... the stored procedure can then unwrap the XML and save data as desired by the user.

== History ==
The initial version of Internet Authentication Service was included with the Windows NT 4.0 Option Pack.

Windows 2000 Server's implementation added support for more intelligent resolution of user names that are part of a Windows Server domain, support for UTF-8 logging, and improved security. It also added support for EAP Authentication for IEEE 802.1x networks. Later on it added PEAP (with service Pack 4).

Windows Server 2003's implementation introduces support for logging to a Microsoft SQL Server database, cross-forest authentication (for Active Directory user accounts in other Forests that the IAS server's Forest has a cross-forest trust relationship with, not to be confused with Domain trust which has been a feature in IAS since NT4), support for IEEE 802.1X port-based authentication, and other features.

All versions of IAS support multi domain setups. Only Windows Server 2003 supports cross forest. While NT4 version includes a Radius Proxy, Windows 2000 didn't have such a feature. Windows Server 2003 reintroduced the feature and is capable of intelligently proxy, load balance, and tolerate faults from faulty or unreachable back-end servers.
