= HCAP =

HCAP may refer to:

- HC Ambri-Piotta, a Swiss ice hockey club
- Healthcare-associated pneumonia
- human cathelicidin antimicrobial protein
- The Honourable Company of Air Pilots, formerly the Guild of Air Pilots and Air Navigators, a London livery company
- Host Credential Authorization Protocol, a component of Microsoft Network Policy Server
- Hitachi Community Action Partnership, a program of The Hitachi Foundation
