= Safe@Office =

Safe@Office is a line of firewall and virtual private network (VPN) appliances developed by SofaWare Technologies, a Check Point company.

== Overview ==
The Check Point Safe@Office product line is targeted at the small and medium business segment, and includes the 500 and 500W (with Wi-Fi) series of internet security appliance. The old S-Box, Safe@Home, 100 series, 200 series, and 400W series are discontinued.

== License ==
The appliances are licensed according to the number of protected IP addresses (referenced to as users) in numbers 5, 25 or unlimited. There is also a variant with a built-in asymmetric disconnection line (ADSL) modem.

== See also ==
- AEGIS SecureConnect
- VPN-1 UTM Edge — similar appliance with possibility of being managed from the Check Point SmartCenter.
