= Supplicant (computer) =

Part of IEEE 802.1X standard

In computer networking, a supplicant is an entity at one end of a point-to-point LAN segment that seeks to be authenticated by an authenticator attached to the other end of that link. The IEEE 802.1X standard uses the term "supplicant" to refer to either hardware or software. In practice, a supplicant is a software application installed on an end-user's computer. The user invokes the supplicant and submits credentials to connect the computer to a secure network. If the authentication succeeds, the authenticator typically allows the computer to connect to the network.

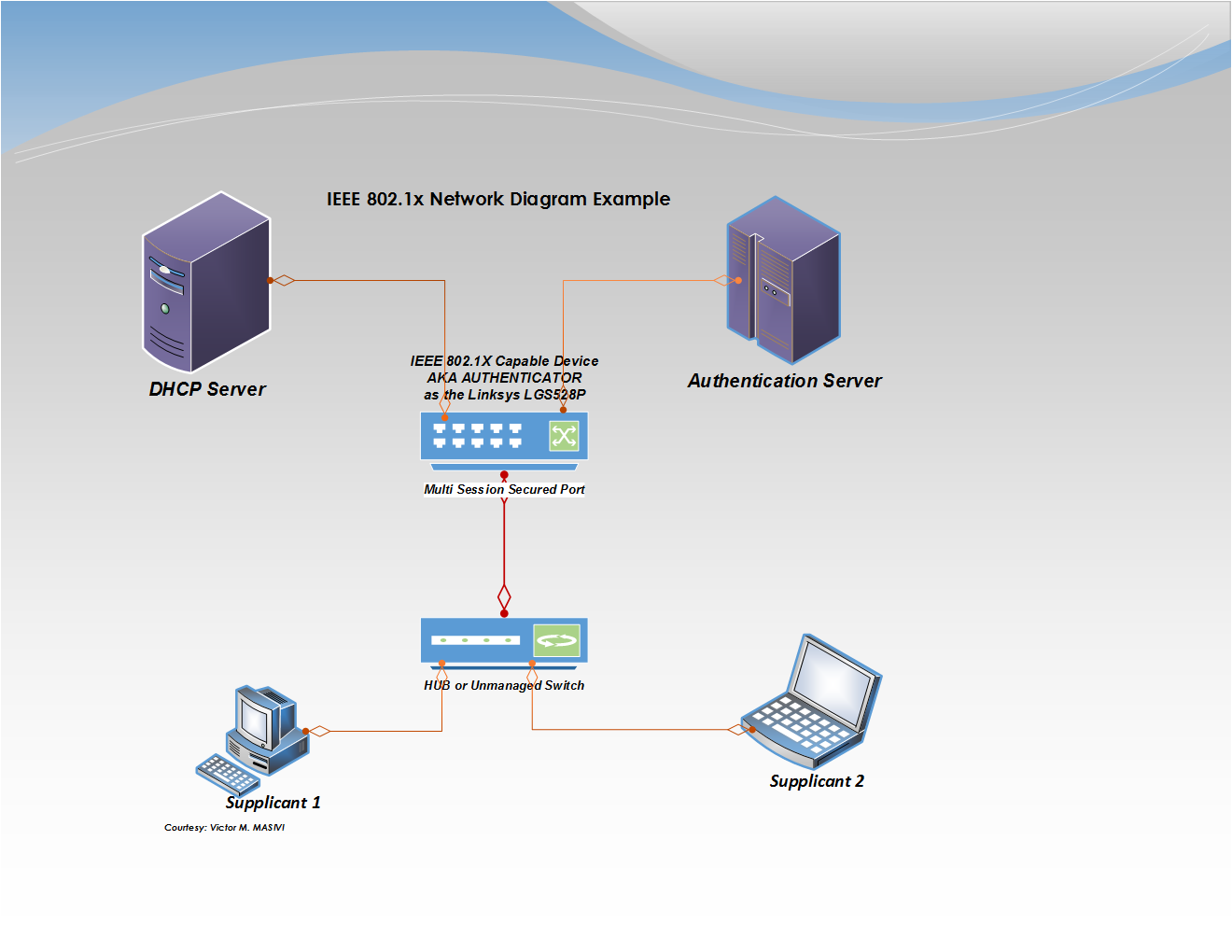
IEEE 802.1x network-diagram example. The hub is optional; the supplicant can connect straight to the authenticator itself. In a hub or an unmanaged switch, the uplink port (the port to which the hub is connected) should be set in multi-session mode.

A supplicant, in some contexts, refers to a user or to a client in a network environment seeking to access network resources secured by the IEEE 802.1X authentication mechanism. But saying "user" or "client" overgeneralizes; in reality, the interaction takes place through a personal computer, an Internet Protocol (IP) phone, or similar network device. Each of these must run supplicant software that initiates or reacts to IEEE 802.1X authentication requests for association.

== Overview ==
Businesses, campuses, governments and all other social entities across-the-board in need of security may resort to the use of IEEE 802.1X authentication to regulate users access to their corresponding network infrastructure. And to enable this, client devices need to meet supplicant definition in order to gain access. In businesses, for example, it is very common that employees will receive their new computer with all the necessary settings appropriately set for IEEE 802.1X authentication, in particular when connecting wirelessly to the network.

== Access ==
For a supplicant-capable device to gain access to the secured resources on a network, some preconditions should be observed and a context that will make this feasible. The network to which the supplicant needs to interact with must have a RADIUS Server (also known as an Authentication Server or an Authenticator), a Dynamic Host Configuration Protocol (DHCP) server if automatic IP address assignment is needed, and in certain configurations, an Active Directory domain controller. The domain controller is particularly needed in Microsoft environments when using Microsoft's Internet Authentication Service (IAS) or Network Policy Server (NPS) software to provide RADIUS services from the Authentication Server.

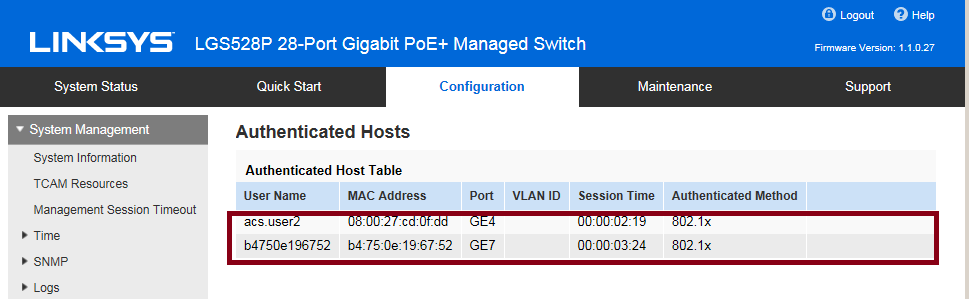
Here is a list of authenticated users as displayed in Linksys LGS528P Switch. In this case, the LGS528P is acting as the Authenticator

== Supplicant list ==
Supplicants include but are not limited to:

- Windows 2000/XP built in
  - Windows 2000 Service Pack 4
  - Windows XP Service Pack 2
- Mac OS X built in ("Internet Connect" utility)
  - OS 10.3 or higher
- AnyConnect Network Access Manager
- Odyssey
- SecureW2
- wpa_supplicant
- Xsupplicant

== Mechanism ==
One aspect of reality a user needs to understand and, more likely comply with the network administrator is the use of user name and password, or a MAC address as the minimum that will be required for account setup.

On a Windows machine, taking an example of Windows 8, one should make sure to enable one's client to act as a supplicant by going to the Network Properties of the Network Interface Card (NIC), and from the Authentication tab, "Enable IEEE 802.1X authentication" need to be checked. Similar steps need to be taken on other network devices that provide support for IEEE 802.1X authentication. This is the most important single step a user will need to make in order for one's network device to act as a supplicant.

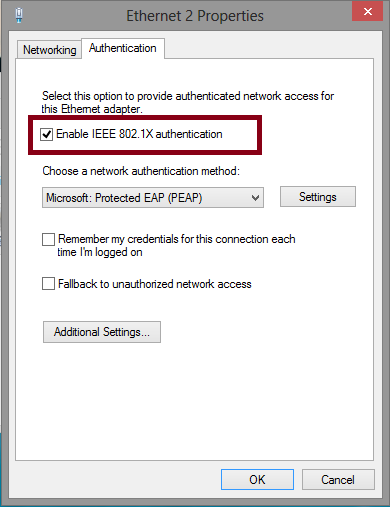
This is a screenshot of the Network Interface Card properties window to enable or disable support for IEEE 802.1x authentication. Many other options can be adjusted as seen fit.

== Notes ==
Note that IAS was being used up to Windows Server 2003; since then, it has been replaced by NPS on all subsequent Windows Server releases (2008, 2012...). IAS and NPS are not the only RADIUS Servers, some other include: FreeRADIUS, Cisco Secure Access Control System (ACS) Server...

== See also ==
- Supplicant
