= Livingston Enterprises =

- Founded: 1986
- Defunct: 1997
- Fate: Acquired by Lucent Technologies
- Key people: Steven Willens (president and CEO)
- Number of employees: 90 (1996)
- Website: livingston.com at the Wayback Machine (archived 29 April 1997)

Livingston Enterprises, Inc. was a computer networking company.

== History ==
Livingston was founded in 1986.

It was involved in a legal case against USRobotics.

=== Acquisition by Lucent ===
The company was acquired by Lucent Technologies in 1997.

== Products ==
=== RADIUS ===
Livingston was the original author of the RADIUS standard for authentication. The open source FreeRADIUS implementation that is being developed since 1999 has a syntax that is similar to the original Livingston implementation.

In 1998, it released the RADIUS Accounting Billing Manager software.

=== PortMaster ===
The first product released in 1990 was the PortMaster Communications Server.

In 1995, the PortMaster Office Router was licensed to Cisco, which formed their 1020 Dial-on-Demand Asynchronous Router.

In 1996, Livingston introduced the allowlist-based internet filter ChoiceNet, which could be used on PortMaster products.

The PortMaster 4 was comparable to the Ascend Communications MAX series.
