= AEGIS SecureConnect =

Network authentication system

AEGIS SecureConnect (or simply AEGIS) is the former name of a network authentication system used in IEEE 802.1X networks. It was developed by Meetinghouse Data Communications, Inc.; the system was renamed "Cisco Secure Services Client" when Meetinghouse was acquired by Cisco Systems. The AEGIS Protocol is an 802.1X supplicant (i.e. handles authentication for wired and wireless networks, such as those that use WPA-PSK, WPA-Radius, or Certificate-based authentication), and is commonly installed along with a Network Interface Card's (NIC) or VPN drivers.
