= FreeRADIUS =

Modular RADIUS suite

- Developer: FreeRADIUS Development Team
- Release: August 1999; 27 years ago
- Stable release: 3.2.10 / 3 June 2026; 3 months ago
- Written in: C; bundled scripts are mostly Perl
- Operating system: Unix-like
- Available in: English
- Type: RADIUS Server
- License: GPLv2
- Website: freeradius.org
- Repository: github.com/FreeRADIUS/freeradius-server

FreeRADIUS is a modular RADIUS suite developed and distributed under the GNU General Public License, version 2. The suite includes a RADIUS server, a BSD-licensed RADIUS client library, a PAM library, an Apache module, and related utilities and development libraries.

FreeRADIUS

In most cases, the word "FreeRADIUS" refers to the free open-source RADIUS server from this suite.

== History ==
FreeRADIUS was started in August 1999 by Alan DeKok and Miquel van Smoorenburg. Miquel had previously written the Cistron RADIUS server, which had gained widespread usage once the Livingston server was no longer being maintained. FreeRADIUS was started to create a new RADIUS server, using a modular design that would encourage more active community involvement.

== Features ==
Modules included with the server core support LDAP, MySQL, PostgreSQL, Oracle, and many other databases. It supports all popular EAP authentication types, including PEAP and EAP-TTLS. More than 100 vendor dictionaries are included.

== See also ==
- Diameter protocol: the proposed replacement for RADIUS
