= IF-MAP =

Specification for a client/server protocol

The Interface for Metadata Access Points (IF-MAP) is an open specification for a client/server protocol developed by the Trusted Computing Group (TCG) as one of the core protocols of the Trusted Network Connect (TNC) open architecture.

IF-MAP provides a common interface between the Metadata Access Point (MAP), a database server acting as a clearinghouse for information about security events and objects, and other elements of the TNC architecture.

The IF-MAP protocol defines a publish/subscribe/search mechanism with a set of identifiers and data types.

== History ==
The IF-MAP protocol was first published by the TCG on April 28, 2008. Originally, the IF-MAP specification was developed to support data sharing across various vendor’s devices and applications for network security. The specification has also been adopted for additional use cases of data-sharing including physical security.

The 2.0 version of the IF-MAP spec separated the base protocol from the metadata definitions that define how different types of information are represented. The goal in separating the base protocol from the metadata definitions within the specification was to allow the specification to be adopted across other technologies (such as cloud computing, industrial control systems, or smart grid) to leverage their existing data models within the MAP framework.

Version 2.1 of the IF-MAP spec was published on May 7, 2012. The primary new feature of IF-MAP 2.1 is that the IF-MAP identifier space became extensible.

A reference implementation is available under GPLv3 license on Google Code repository.
