= Handover keying =

In wireless technology, handover keying (Hokey) refers to maintaining a secure connection seamlessly while migrating from one Wireless network to another.
