= Funk Software =

American software company based in Cambridge, Massachusetts

- Founded: 1982
- Defunct: 2005
- Fate: Acquired
- Headquarters: Cambridge, MA, United States
- Products: Network access security solutions
- Website: www.juniper.net www.pulsesecure.net

Funk Software was an American software company based in Cambridge, Massachusetts, and active from 1982 to 2005. The company was founded in 1982 by Paul Funk. Funk was later acquired by Juniper Networks in 2005 for US$122 million.

The company first became well known in the late 80's for its product Sideways, which allowed users to print wide spreadsheets on dot matrix printers. Dot matrix printing was the primary printing technology at that time.

Funk Software later became a provider of network access security solutions for networks of any size, from enterprise to operator, wired or wireless. The company's products were security related and they were grouped as a family of RADIUS/AAA and WLAN security products. These types of network security products allow an organization to enforce a uniform security policy across all network access methods, including WLAN, remote/VPN, dial, and identity-based (wired 802.1X - also referred to as a supplicant based authentication system) - with the performance and reliability to handle any traffic load, and with full support for any network infrastructure. Funk Software's customers included many of the world's largest corporations, institutions, telecommunications carriers, and internet service providers (ISPs); its products are licensed or resold by numerous leading manufacturers of Internet hardware and software. One of the leading products was OAC - Odyssey Access Client, which is still used today, branded as a Juniper Networks Product UAC - User Access Client.

In 2014, Juniper Networks sold off the business unit that was responsible for the legacy Funk Software enterprise products to New York-based Siris Capital. Siris Capital created a new company and named it Pulse Secure, LLC with its headquarters in San Jose, CA. Steel-Belted Radius (SBR) Enterprise and Global Enterprise are still being sold under the new company's brand. It was announced that Pulse Secure will EOL SBR Enterprise and Global Enterprise as of December 31, 2020. Steel-Belted Radius Carrier Edition is still being sold by Juniper Networks.

The Odyssey Access Client (OAC) has been EOL'd (End of Life) as of December 31, 2017.

Several Funk Software employees remain with Ivanti and Juniper Networks as of 2026.

End of 2020 Pulse Secure was acquired by Ivanti.

The enterprise version of Steel-Belted Radius server was EOL'd in 2021 by Ivanti. However, HPE / Juniper still maintain the Carrier version of Steel-Belted Radius as well as expanding to a DIAMETER version of the product.

== See also ==
- List of acquisitions by Juniper Networks
