= Lightweight Extensible Authentication Protocol =

Lightweight Extensible Authentication Protocol (LEAP) is a proprietary wireless LAN authentication method developed by Cisco Systems. Important features of LEAP are dynamic WEP keys and mutual authentication (between a wireless client and a RADIUS server). LEAP allows for clients to re-authenticate frequently; upon each successful authentication, the clients acquire a new WEP key (with the hope that the WEP keys don't live long enough to be cracked). LEAP may be configured to use TKIP instead of dynamic WEP.

Some 3rd party vendors also support LEAP through the Cisco Compatible Extensions Program.

An unofficial description of the protocol is available.

== Security considerations ==
Cisco LEAP, similar to WEP, has had well-known security weaknesses since 2003 involving offline password cracking. LEAP uses a modified version of MS-CHAP, an authentication protocol in which user credentials are not strongly protected. Stronger authentication protocols employ a salt to strengthen the credentials against eavesdropping during the authentication process. Cisco's response to the weaknesses of LEAP suggests that network administrators either force users to have stronger, more complicated passwords or move to another authentication protocol also developed by Cisco, EAP-FAST, to ensure security. Automated tools like ASLEAP demonstrate the simplicity of getting unauthorized access in networks protected by LEAP implementations.
