= Network Policy Server =

Component of Windows Server 2008

Network Policy and Access Services (NPAS) is a component of Windows Server 2008. It replaces the Internet Authentication Service (IAS) from Windows Server 2003. The NPAS server role includes Network Policy Server (NPS), Health Registration Authority (HRA), and Host Credential Authorization Protocol (HCAP). In Windows Server 2003, IAS is the Microsoft implementation of a Remote Authentication Dial-In User Service (RADIUS) server. In Windows Server operating systems later than Windows Server 2003, IAS is renamed to NPS.

== Overview ==
NPS is a role service in Windows Server 2008 which can function as:

- RADIUS server
- RADIUS proxy
- Network Access Protection policy server

== Features ==
NPSEE enables the use of a heterogeneous set of wireless, switch, remote access, or VPN equipment. One can use NPS with the Routing and Remote Access service, which is available in Microsoft Windows 2000, Windows Server 2003, Standard Edition; Windows Server 2003, Enterprise Edition; and Windows Server 2003, Datacenter Edition. You can manage the policies with Network Security Policy Management(NSPM)

When a server running NPS is a member of an Active Directory Domain Services (AD DS) domain, NPS uses the directory service as its user account database and is part of a single sign-on solution. The same set of credentials is used for network access control (authenticating and authorizing access to a network) and to log on to an AD DS domain.
