= AuthIP =

AuthIP is a Microsoft proprietary extension of the IKE cryptographic protocol. AuthIP is supported in Windows Vista and later on the client and Windows Server 2008 and later on the server. AuthIP adds a second authentication to the standard IKE authentication which, according to Microsoft, increases security and deployability of IPsec VPNs. AuthIP adds support for user-based authentication by using Kerberos v5 or SSL certificates.

AuthIP is not compatible with IKEv2, an IETF standard with similar characteristics; however Windows 7 and Windows Server 2008 R2 also support IKEv2.

== See also ==
- SSTP
