= Authentication server =

An authentication server provides a network service that applications use to authenticate the credentials, usually account names and passwords, of their users. When a client submits a valid set of credentials, it receives a cryptographic ticket that it can subsequently use to access various services.

Authentication is used as the basis for authorization, which is the determination whether a privilege may be granted to a particular user or process, privacy, which keeps information from becoming known to non-participants, and non-repudiation, which is the inability to deny having done something that was authorized to be done based on the authentication.

Major authentication algorithms include passwords, Kerberos, and public key encryption.

== See also ==
- TACACS+
- RADIUS
- Multi-factor authentication
- Universal 2nd Factor
