= MS-CHAP =

Authentication protocol to validate users

MS-CHAP is the Microsoft version of the Challenge-Handshake Authentication Protocol (CHAP).

== Versions ==
The protocol exists in two versions, MS-CHAPv1 (defined in RFC 2433) and MS-CHAPv2 (defined in RFC 2759). MS-CHAPv2 was introduced with pptp3-fix that was included in Windows NT 4.0 SP4 and was added to Windows 98 in the "Windows 98 Dial-Up Networking Security Upgrade Release" and Windows 95 in the "Dial Up Networking 1.3 Performance & Security Update for MS Windows 95" upgrade. Windows Vista dropped support for MS-CHAPv1.

== Applications ==
MS-CHAP is used as one authentication option in Microsoft's implementation of the PPTP protocol for virtual private networks. It is also used as an authentication option with RADIUS servers which are used with IEEE 802.1X (e.g., WiFi security using the WPA-Enterprise protocol). It is further used as the main authentication option of the Protected Extensible Authentication Protocol (PEAP).

== Features ==
Compared with CHAP, MS-CHAP: works by negotiating CHAP Algorithm 0x80 (0x81 for MS-CHAPv2) in LCP option 3, Authentication Protocol. It provides an authenticator-controlled password change mechanism. It provides an authenticator-controlled authentication retry mechanism and defines failure codes returned in the Failure packet message field.

MS-CHAPv2 provides mutual authentication between peers by piggybacking a peer challenge on the response packet and an authenticator response on the success packet.

MS-CHAP requires each peer to either know the plaintext password, or an MD4 hash of the password, and does not transmit the password over the link. As such, it is not compatible with most password storage formats.

== Flaws ==
Weaknesses have been identified in MS-CHAP and MS-CHAPv2. The DES encryption used in NTLMv1 and MS-CHAPv2 to encrypt the NTLM password hash enable custom hardware attacks utilizing the method of brute force.

As of 2012, MS-CHAP had been completely broken. The divide-and-conquer attack only requires breaking a single DES key, which is not difficult with modern GPUs and FPGAs. MS-CHAP as a whole can be viewed as a smoke-and-mirrors protocol, in that ~80% of the protocol provides no real security; it just makes the construction very complicated and thus appear infeasible to crack. In reality, this ~80% is either plaintext messages, or messages easily derived from those sent in plaintext. The actual security core is reduced to the NTLM password hash and DES encryptions keyed by the hash output, which is fundamentally weak.

After Windows 11 22H2, with the default activation of Windows Defender Credential Guard, users can no longer authenticate with MSCHAPv2. The developers recommend a move from MSCHAPv2-based connections to certificate-based authentication (such as PEAP-TLS or EAP-TLS).

== See also ==
- EFF DES cracker
