= Link protection =

Computer networking concept

Link protection is designed to safeguard networks from failure. Failures in high-speed networks have always been a concern of utmost importance. A single fiber cut can lead to heavy losses of traffic and protection-switching techniques have been used as the key source to ensure survivability in networks. Survivability can be addressed in many layers in a network and protection can be performed at the physical layer (SONET/SDH, Optical Transport Network), Layer 2 (Ethernet, MPLS) and Layer 3 (IP).

Protection architectures like Path protection and Link protection safeguard the above-mentioned networks from different kinds of failures. In path protection, a backup path is used from the source to its destination to bypass the failure. In Link protection, the end nodes of the failed link initiate the protection. These nodes detect the fault responsible to initiate the protection mechanisms in order to detour the affected traffic from the failed link onto predetermined reserved paths. Other types of protection are channel-, segment- and p-cycle protection.

== Link Protection in the Optical Transport Layer ==
In older high-speed transport networks, the SONET layer (also SDH) was the main client wavelength-division multiplexing (WDM) layer. For this reason, before WDM protection schemes were defined, SONET protection mechanisms were mainly adopted to guarantee optical network survivability. When the WDM layer was created, the optical networks survivability techniques in consideration were mainly based on many elements of SONET protection in order to ensure maximum compatibility with the legacy systems (SONET systems). Hence some of the WDM-layer protection techniques are very similar to SONET/SDH protection techniques in the case of ring networks.

=== Ring-Based protection ===
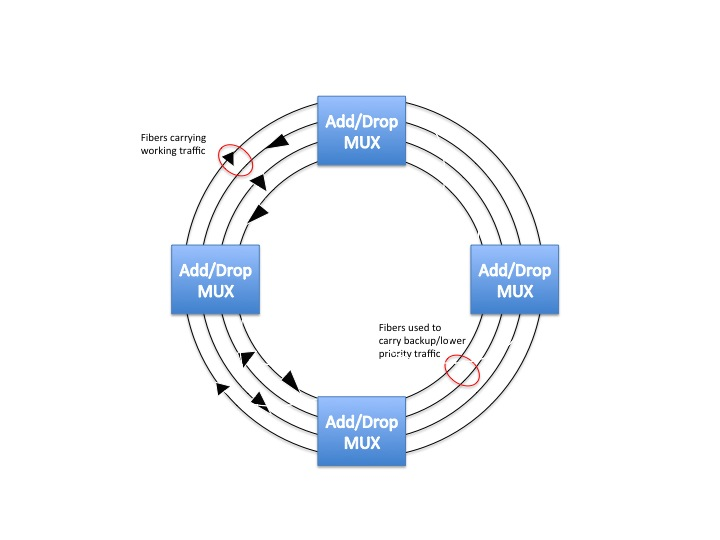
A four-fiber BLSR: Two fibers are used as working fibers and the other two are used as protection fibers, to be utilized in the case of a failure.

In the case of a link or network failure, the simplest mechanism for network survivability is automatic protection switching (APS). APS techniques involve reserving a protection channel (dedicated or shared) with the same capacity of the channel or element being protected. When a shared protection technique is used, an APS protocol is needed to coordinate access to the shared protection bandwidth. An example of a link-based protection architecture at the Optical Transport Network layer is a Bidirectional Line Switched Ring (BLSR). In a BLSR, every link can carry both the working and backup traffic at the same time and hence does not require backup links. Unlike a UPSR (see SONET), in a BLSR, under normal circumstances, the protection fiber is unused and this is beneficial to ISP's since they can use the protection fiber to send lower priority traffic (using protection bandwidth) like data traffic and voice traffic.

There are two architectures for BLSRs. The four-fiber BLSR and the two-fiber BLSR. In a four-fiber BLSR, two fibers are used as working fibers and the other two are used as protection fibers, to be utilized in the case of a failure. Four-fiber BLSRs use two types of protection mechanisms during failure recovery, namely ring and span switching. In span switching, when the source or destination on a link fails, traffic gets routed onto the protection fiber between the two nodes on the same link and when a fiber or cable cut occurs, service is restored using the ring switching mechanism.

In a two-fiber BLSR, the protection fibers are contained within the working fibers (like a four-fiber BLSR) and both the fibers are used to carry working traffic whilst keeping only half the capacity on each fiber for protection purposes. Two-fiber BLSRs also benefit from the ring switching but cannot perform span switching like a four-fiber BLSR.

Due to its efficiency in protection, BLSRs are widely deployed in long haul and interoffice networks, where the traffic pattern is more distributed than in access networks. Most metro carriers have deployed two-fiber BLSRs, while many long-haul carriers have deployed four-fiber BLSRs since they can handle more load than two-fiber BLSRs.

=== Mesh-based protection ===
The techniques mentioned above for SONET and WDM networks can also be applied to mesh network architectures provided there are ring decompositions for the mesh architectures; and use well defined protection-switching schemes to restore service when a failure occurs. The three most notable ring-based protection techniques for mesh networks are ring covers, cycle double covers and p-cycles (pre-configured protection cycles).

The main goal of the ring cover technique is to find a set of rings that covers all the network links and then use these rings to protect the network against failures. Some network links in the ring cover might get used in more than one ring which can cause additional redundancy in the network and because of this reason, scaling down redundancy is the primary focus of this technique.

The cycle double covers technique provides one protection fiber for each working fiber (like in SONET rings) keeping 100% redundancy. This technique was initially proposed to remove the additional redundancy issue caused by the ring cover scheme.

The p-cycle technique is based on the property of a ring to protect not only its own links, but also any possible links connecting two non-adjacent ring nodes called chordal links. By doing this, p-cycles reduce the redundancy required to protect a mesh network against link failure. There are two types of p-cycles namely link p-cycles and node p-cycles. Link p-cycles protect all channels on a link whereas a node p-cycle protects all the connections traversing a node.

One of the best features of p-cycles is its ability to allow savings in spare resources and they are also recognized to be the most efficient protection structures as for capacity minimization. However, p- cycle planning is an NP-hard problem and is not scalable.

Another technique called the generalized loopback technique can be included under ring-based approaches. Although it is not strictly considered as one of the mesh-based ring protection techniques, its usage of a loopback operation is similar to the APS operation in rings to switch the signal from working to the redundant capacity.

== Link protection in the Client/Service Layer ==
=== Protection in Ethernet ===
Ethernet links use link aggregation as a mechanism to recover from failures. Even when a link fails, its link capacity gets reduced but the communication system keeps working without interruptions in data flow.

Other terms used to describe link aggregation include IEEE 802.1ax (formerly knows as 802.3ad), link bundling or NIC teaming.

=== Protection in IP ===
In recent years, packet based networks made a big leap and almost every single service provided (voice, IP-TV, etc.) is IP based. This is due to the reason that the IP layer has long provided best-effort services.

IP uses dynamic, hop-by-hop routing of packets and if there is a link failure, the routing protocols (OSPF or IS-IS) operates in a distributed manner and updates the routing table at each router in the domain. This process can get slow and cause heavy delays in the network. In order to avoid slow recovery, every IP link can be protected using protocols at the lower levels which will help the IP links to recover by itself instead of waiting for the IP routing table to change. For example, IP links can be realized by protected MPLS using Label Switched Paths – LSPs (IP over MPLS).

=== Protection in MPLS Networks ===
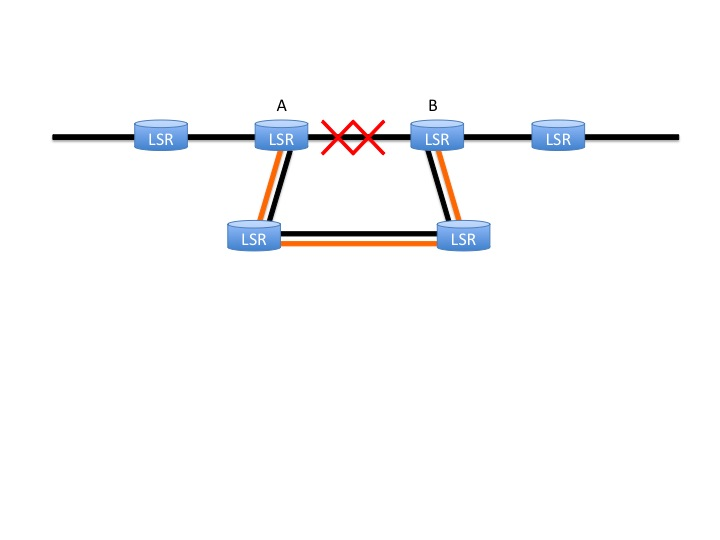
Between LSRs A and B a tunnel (orange) is set up. When the link between LSR A and B fails, the initial LSP (black) is redirected down the orange tunnel so that there is no disruption of data flow between A and B.

MPLS based networks use fast re-route as its network resiliency mechanism. In MPLS fast re-route, MPLS data can be directed around a link failure without the need to perform any signaling when a failure is detected.

One form of fast re-route is called Link Protection. In this protection, an LSP tunnel is set up through the network to provide a backup for a vulnerable physical link. The LSP provides a parallel virtual link. When the physical link fails, the upstream node switches traffic to the virtual link so that data continues to flow with a minimal disruption.

The capacity of the backup LSP should be sufficient to carry the protected LSPs. Depending on the LSPs, the capacity needs to be configured. For instance, if all the LSPs are to be protected, then the net capacity should equal the bandwidth of the protected link. By doing this, the backup bandwidth would increase if multiple links were to be protected. On the other hand, by leaving some LSPs over the link unprotected, the backup bandwidth can be reduced.

== See also ==
- SONET
- Routing and wavelength assignment
- Multiwavelength optical networking
- Optical mesh network
- Optical Transport Network
- MPLS local protection
