= Transmission system =

System that transmits a signal from one place to another

In telecommunications, a transmission system is a communication system that transmits a signal from one place to another. The signal can be an electrical, optical or radio signal. The goal of a transmission system is to transmit data accurately and efficiently from point A to point B over a distance, using a variety of technologies such as copper cable and fiber-optic cables, satellite links, and wireless communication technologies.

The International Telecommunication Union (ITU) and the European Telecommunications Standards Institute (ETSI) define a transmission system as the interface and medium through which peer physical layer entities transfer bits. It encompasses all the components and technologies involved in transmitting digital data from one location to another, including modems, cables, and other networking equipment. Some transmission systems contain multipliers, which amplify a signal prior to re-transmission, or regenerators, which attempt to reconstruct and re-shape the coded message before re-transmission.

One of the most widely used transmission system technologies in the Internet and the public switched telephone network (PSTN) is synchronous optical networking (SONET).

Also, transmission system is the medium through which data is transmitted from one point to another. Examples of common transmission systems people use everyday are: the internet, mobile networks, cordless cables, etc.

== Digital transmission system ==
The ITU defines a digital transmission system as a system that uses digital signals to transmit information. In a digital transmission system, the data is first converted into a digital format and then transmitted over a communication channel. The digital format provides a number of benefits over analog transmission systems, including improved signal quality, reduced noise and interference, and increased data accuracy.

ITU defines digital transmission system (DTS) as following:

A specific means of providing a digital section.

The ITU sets global standards for digital transmission systems, including the encoding and decoding methods used, the data rates and transmission speeds, and the types of communication channels used. These standards ensure that digital transmission systems are compatible and interoperable with each other, regardless of the type of data being transmitted or the geographical location of the sender and receiver.

=== Basic components of a DTS ===
- Point-to-point links are communication systems between two endpoints, usually a sender (transmitter) and a receiver.
  - System performance analysis:
    - Link power budget is a power loss model for a point-to-point link.
    - Rise time budget is analysis method used to measure the amount of dispersion which is present in a link.
- Line coding is the process of transforming data into digital signals for transmission over a point-to-point link. Can include binary data source, multiplexer and line coder.
  - Non-return-to-zero (NRZ)
  - Return-to-zero (RZ)
  - Phase-encoded (PE)
  - Block codes
- Error correction techniques are used to detect and correct errors that occur during transmission.
  - Automatic repeat request (ARQ)
  - Forward error correction (FEC)
- Noise effects on system performance can be minimized by using signal conditioning techniques such as signal amplification and filtering.

These techniques are used to improve signal-to-noise ratio, which helps to maintain the integrity of the signal during transmission.

== See also ==
- Carrier system
- Communications satellite
- Signal transmission
- Submarine communications cable – a cable on the sea bed
