= OCX =

OCX or OCx may refer to:

- Next-Generation operational control segment, part of an initiative to modernize GPS Block III satellite operations
- OLE custom control, a predecessor of ActiveX controls from Microsoft
- OCx, generic reference for any type of optical carrier signal
