= DACCS =

DACCS may refer to:

- Digital cross connect system
- Direct air carbon capture and storage
