= SNCP =

SNCP may refer to:

- Storage Networking Certification Program
- Subnetwork Connection Protection
