= OXC =

OXC may refer to:

- Optical cross-connect
- Waterbury-Oxford Airport
