= G.783 =

Recommendation for designing digital communication

ITU-T Recommendation G.783 "Characteristics of synchronous digital hierarchy (SDH) equipment functional blocks" defines a library of basic building blocks and a set of rules by which they may be combined in order to describe a digital transmission equipment. The library comprises the functional building blocks needed to specify completely the generic functional structure of the Synchronous Digital Hierarchy. In order to be compliant with this Recommendation, equipment needs to be describable as an interconnection of a subset of these functional blocks contained within this Recommendation. The interconnections of these blocks should obey the combination rules given.

This Recommendation defines both the components and the methodology that should be used in order to specify SDH processing; it does not define an individual SDH equipment as such.

The specification method is based on functional decomposition of the equipment into atomic and compound functions. The equipment is then described by its Equipment Functional Specification (EFS) which lists the constituent atomic and compound functions, their interconnection, and any overall performance objectives (e.g., transfer delay, availability, etc.).

The internal structure of the implementation of this functionality (equipment design) need not be identical to the structure of the functional model, as long as all the details of the externally observable behavior comply with the EFS.

The equipment functionality is consistent with the SDH multiplexing structure given in ITU-T Recommendation G.707/Y.1322.
