= Wavelength switched optical network =

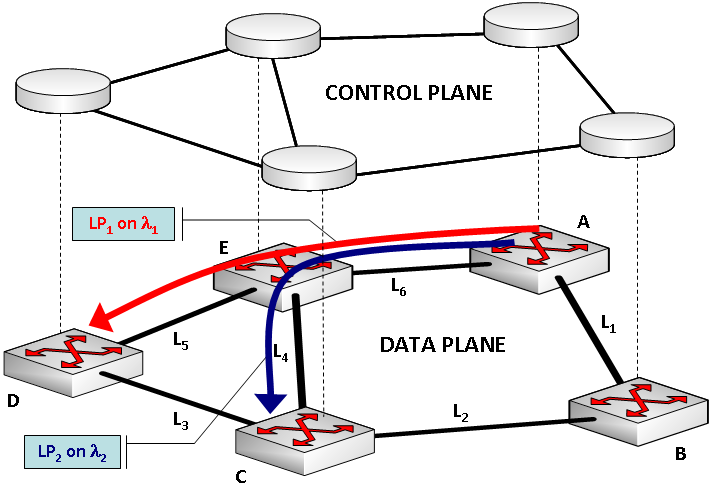
Wavelength Switched Optical Network with two established lightpaths

Wavelength switched optical network (WSON) is a type of telecommunications network.

A WSON consists of two planes: the data and the control planes. The data plane comprises wavelength-division multiplexing (WDM) fiber links connecting optical cross-connect (OXCs) through a comb of several tens of wavelength channels, with typical data rates of 10 or 40 Gbit/s. Optical end-to-end connections (i.e., lightpaths) are established in the optical domain and switched by OXCs at the wavelength granularity.

The dynamic provisioning and maintenance of lightpaths is managed by the control plane. The control plane is implemented on a separate network and typically employs one network controller for each node in the data plane, as shown in the figure. The Generalized Multi-Protocol Label Switching (GMPLS) protocol suite, the de facto standard control plane for WSONs proposed by the IETF, is composed of three protocols.
