= Ring protection =

Telecommunication redundancy mechanism

In a telecommunication network, a ring network affords fault tolerance to the network because there are two paths between any two nodes on the network. Ring protection is the system used to assure communication continues in the event of failure of one of the paths. There are two widely used protection architectures: 1+1 protection and 1:1 protection.

== 1+1 protection ==
In one plus one (1+1) architecture, a single protection path is used to protect the signal. In this case the bridge at the head of the path is permanent. It is at the tail end where the switching occurs. In this architecture traffic is sent over two parallel routes, and the destination or the receiving end selects the better of these two signals. In case of any failure, the destination switches onto the alternative path/route. This architecture is simple for implementation and results fast restoration. Its major drawback is the wastage of bandwidth, since no traffic travels through the redundant path.

== 1:1 protection ==
In 1:1 architecture, the signal is protected by a single protection path where the bridge at the head end is not permanent. When the primary path fails it switches to the alternate path. During normal operation, no traffic or only low priority traffic is sent through the redundant path. When any failure occurs, both the source and destination switch onto the redundant or alternate path. Network utilization is better in this architecture, but it requires signaling overhead and also results in slower restoration.

== See also ==
- Optical mesh network
