= Subnetwork connection protection =

In telecommunications, subnetwork connection protection (SNCP), is a type of protection mechanism associated with synchronous optical networks such as synchronous digital hierarchy (SDH).

SNCP is a dedicated (1+1) protection mechanism for SDH network spans which may be deployed in ring, point to point or mesh topologies.

== Relation to other mechanisms ==
It is complementary to Multiplex Section Protection (MSP), applied to physical handover interfaces; which offers 1+1 protection of the handover.

An alternative to SNCP is Multiplex Section Shared Protection Ring (MS-SP Ring), which offers a shared protection mode, and Multiplex Section Dedicated Protection Ring (MS-DP Ring), which offers a dedicated protection mode.

SNCP's functional equivalent in SONET is called UPSR

== Specifications ==
SNCP is a per path protection. It follows the principle of Congruent Sending Selective Receive, i.e., Signal is sent on both paths but received only where the Signal Strength is best. When the working path for Signal receiving is cut, the receiver detects SD (Signal Degradation) and the receiver of the other path becomes active.

SNCP is a network protection mechanism for SDH networks providing path protection (end-to-end protection). The data signal is transmitted in a ring structure via two different paths and can be implemented in line or ring structures. The changeover criteria are specified individually when configuring a network element. A protection protocol is not required. The switchover to protection path occurs in the non-revertive mode, i.e. if traffic was switched to the protection path due to a transmission fault, there is no automatic switch-back to the original path once the fault is rectified, but only if there is a fault on the new path (the one labeled as "protecting" and currently services traffic).

== Functionality of mechanism ==
SNCP is a 1+1 protection scheme (one working and one protection transport entity). Input traffic is broadcast in two routes (one being the normal working route and the second one being the protection route).

Assume a failure free state for a path from a node B to a node A. Node B bridges the signal destined to A from other nodes on the ring, both on working and protecting routes. At node A, signals from these two routes are continuously monitored for path layer defects and the better quality signal is selected. Now consider a failure state where fiber between node A and node B is cut. The selector switches traffic on the standby route when the active route between node A and node B is failed.

In order to prevent any unnecessary or spurious protection switching in the presence of bit errors on both paths, a switch will typically occur when the quality of the alternate path exceeds that of the current working path by some threshold (e.g., an order of magnitude better BER). Consecutively, any case of failure drops in SNCP's decision mechanism.

== See also ==
- Optical mesh network
