= Regenerator (telecommunications) =

Telecommunications Device

A regenerator in a telecommunications context is a type of repeater that is used in copper line or optical fibre line transmission systems. The regeneration function involved also appears in other types of systems, e.g. computer networking systems.

A digital signal travelling a significant distance will become weaker and distorted and require periodic help to continue its journey successfully.

A simple amplifier will only increase the amplitude of the signal and will not correct the distortion of the waveform shape.

A threshold detector can be used to correct the amplitude levels although the exact time that the transition occurs may not be in the right place. This timing inaccuracy is referred to as jitter.

A regenerator includes circuitry to recover the clock timing information, which is then used to determine when the output signal switches its state. This ensures that the recovered data from the threshold detector is adjusted to provide the correctly timed signal output.
