= Traffic grooming =

Traffic grooming is the process of grouping many small telecommunications flows into larger units, which can be processed as single entities. For example, in a network using both time-division multiplexing (TDM) and wavelength-division multiplexing (WDM), two flows which are destined for a common node can be placed on the same wavelength, allowing them to be dropped by a single optical add-drop multiplexer. Often the objective of grooming is minimizing the cost of the network. The cost of line terminating equipment (LTE) (also called add/drop multiplexers or ADMs) is the most dominant component in an optical WDM network's cost. Thus grooming typically involves minimizing the usage of ADMs.

This is similar to the use of virtual channels and virtual paths in ATM networks.

Effective grooming requires consideration of the topology of the network and the different routes in use. This is especially useful when dealing with mesh networks.

== Grooming Algorithms ==
The traffic grooming problem has proven to be computationally intractable in the general case. Hence heuristic solutions are typically used.

== Electrical-Layer Grooming ==
Grooms electrical signals at a granularity of ODUk(k =1, 2(e), 3, 4, or flex).

- Services are transmitted to tributary boards and groomed to line boards through the cross-connect board, encapsulated and mapped to OTU signals on the line boards, and then transmitted to the WDM side.
- Through electrical-layer grooming, services of different granularity are groomed and encapsulated into one wavelength and output to the WDM side. This enables multiple services to share the bandwidth, greatly improving bandwidth utilization.

== Optical-Layer Grooming ==
Grooms optical signals at a granularity of wavelength (λ) by flexibly selecting transmission paths.

- After receiving OTU optical signals, the ROADM board creates optical cross-connection paths internally and outputs the signals to specified egresses. Each egress corresponds to a specific path
- Operation personnel can remotely control the transmission paths of optical signals by creating and adjusting cross-connection paths on the NMS
- Optical-layer grooming used together with the ASON technology can implement automatic fault detection and line adjustment to ensure normal transmission of services.
