= Optical cross-connect =

Switch between light-conducting fiber circuits

An optical cross-connect (OXC) is a device used by telecommunications carriers to switch high-speed optical signals in a fiber optic network, such as an optical mesh network.

In the 1980s, when transmission speeds supported by optical fibers increased from 45 Mbit/s to 2.5 Gbit/s, carrier networks developed and introduced digital cross connects to restore 64 kbit/s, 1.5 Mbit/s, and 45 Mbit/s traffic.

There are several ways to realize an OXC:

- Opaque OXCs (electronic switching) - One can implement an OXC in the electronic domain: all the input optical signals are converted into electronic signals after they are demultiplexed by demultiplexers. The electronic signals are then switched by an electronic switch module. Finally, the switched electronic signals are converted back into optical signals by using them to modulate lasers and then the resulting optical signals are multiplexed by optical multiplexers onto outlet optical fibers. This is known as an "OEO" (Optical-Electrical-Optical) design. Cross-connects based on an OEO switching process generally have a key limitation: the electronic circuits limit the maximum bandwidth of the signal. Such an architecture prevents an OXC from performing with the same speed as an all-optical cross-connect, and is not transparent to the network protocols used. On the other hand, it is easy to monitor signal quality in an OEO device, since everything is converted back to the electronic format at the switch node. An additional advantage is that the optical signals are regenerated, so they leave the node free of dispersion and attenuation. An electronic OXC is also called an opaque OXC.
- Transparent OXCs (optical switching) - Switching optical signals in an all-optical device is the second approach to realize an OXC. Such a switch is often called a transparent OXC or photonic cross-connect (PXC). Specifically, optical signals are demultiplexed, then the demultiplexed wavelengths are switched by optical switch modules. After switching, the optical signals are multiplexed onto output fibers by optical multiplexers. Such a switch architecture keeps the features of data rate and protocol transparency. However, because the signals are kept in the optical format, the transparent OXC architecture does not allow easy optical signal quality monitoring.
- Translucent OXCs (optical and electronic switching) - As a compromise between opaque and transparent OXC's, there is a type of OXC called a translucent OXC. In such a switch architecture, there is a switch stage which consists of an optical switch module and an electronic switch module. Optical signals passing through the switch stage can be switched either by the optical switch module or the electronic switch module. In most cases, the optical switch module is preferred for the purpose of transparency. When the optical switch module's switching interfaces are all busy or an optical signal needs signal regeneration through an OEO conversion process, the electronic module is used. Translucent OXC nodes provide a compromise of full optical signal transparency and comprehensive optical signal monitoring. It also provides the possibility of signal regeneration at each node.

An optical add-drop multiplexer (OADM) can be viewed as a special case of an OXC, where to node degree is two.

== See also ==
- Optical switch
- Optical Carrier
- MEMS
- Digital access and cross-connect system
