= Multiwavelength optical networking =

Proposed successor to SONET optical networks

Multiwavelength optical networking (MONET), is a method for communicating digital information using lasers over optical fiber. The method provides the next level of communication networks after SONET optical networks. MONET optical networks provide an even greater bandwidth capacity. This new method employs wavelength-division multiplexing (WDM) technology for transporting large amounts of telephone and data traffic and allow for interoperability between equipment from different vendors.

First developed by the secretive National Security Agency as author James Bamford points out in his book, "Body of Secrets: Anatomy of the Ultra-Secret National Security Agency". It was also discussed at the 1996 Military Communications Conference.
