= Digital cross-connect system =

Telecommunications equipment

A digital cross-connect system (DCS or DXC) is a piece of circuit-switched network equipment, used in telecommunications networks, that allows lower-level TDM bit streams, such as DS0 bit streams, to be rearranged and interconnected among higher-level TDM signals, such as DS1 bit streams. DCS units are available that operate on both older T-carrier/E-carrier bit streams, as well as newer SONET/SDH bit streams.

DCS devices can be used for "grooming" telecommunications traffic, switching traffic from one circuit to another in the event of a network failure, supporting automated provisioning, and other applications. Having a DCS in a circuit-switched network provides important flexibility that can otherwise only be obtained at higher cost using manual "DSX" cross-connect patch panels.

DCS devices "switch" traffic, but they are not packet switches—they switch circuits, not packets, and the circuit arrangements they are used to manage tend to persist over very long time spans, typically months or longer, as compared to packet switches, which can route every packet differently, and operate on micro- or millisecond time spans.

DCS units are also sometimes colloquially called "DACS" units, after a proprietary brand name of DCS units created and sold by AT&T's Western Electric division, now Alcatel-Lucent.

Modern digital access and cross-connect systems are not limited to the T-carrier system, and may accommodate high data rates such as those of SONET.

== Transmuxing ==
Transmuxing (transmux: transcode multiplexing) is a telecommunications signaling format change between two signaling methods, typically synchronous optical network signals, SONET, and various time-division multiplexing, TDM, signals. Transmuxing changes the “container” without changing the “contents.” Transmuxing provides the carrier the capability to embed a telecommunications signal from one logical TDM circuit to another within SONET without physically breaking down the TDM circuit into its components and reconstructing it.

There are two types of transmuxing – electrical transmuxing and Optical transmuxing (sometimes called portless transmuxing). In electrical transmuxing, TDM signals (typically DS1/T1 or DS3) are brought in using copper connections, transmuxed to SONET and transported across the network until the reverse occurs. In optical transmuxing, TDM signals (DS1/T1, DS3, OCx) are brought in using fiber optics, transmuxed to SONET and transported across the network until the reverse occurs. In the U.S. and Japan, DS1/T1 signals are transmuxed into a SONET virtual tributary called a VT1.5.

== Traffic grooming ==
Traffic grooming is the process of grouping smaller telecommunications signals into larger. This is typically done to minimize the number of connections and circuits needed to optimize the total cost. In TDM, 24 DS0 signals are grouped into a DS1/T1 signal and 28 DS1/T1 signals are groomed into a DS3 signal. A single DS3 signal carries 44.736 Mbit/s of data (672 DS0) and can be sent using a single cable.

== Circuit switching ==
Circuit switching is the process of redirecting data signals from one input location to another.

== Mixed traffic handling ==
In a Central Office DCS system, all kinds of signals connect into a DCS. Common signals connecting to a DCS are at the Electrical - DS1, DS3 levels and Optical (OCx) - OC3, OC12, OC48, and OC192. The DCS must be able to groom the traffic, economically and quickly, at the most efficient and desired levels. This is performed at the lowest level possible - DS1 level (or VT1.5) is preferred. A SONET 3/1 DCS will transmux and carry DS3 signals as STS-1 signals and groom TDM DS1/T1s using VT1.5 signals.

The Central Office is where signals are generally switched and groomed to route DS1s needing to be mapped to other Optical or Electrical signals to get to different equipment or sent along to other Central Offices. If an Electrical DS3 is received, it would be connected to an Electrical Transmux port in the DCS where it would be converted from a DS3, demultiplexed back down to the DS1 level (28 DS1s), overhead would be added to the DS1s to make them VT1.5s and the VT1.5s would be put into an STS-1 and sent to the DCS Matrix as a VT mapped STS-1. If a DS3 is delivered to the Central Office inside a STS-1 (DS3 mapped STS1) carried in an OCx signal, the OCx would be connected to the DCS where the DS3 mapped STS-1 would be Optically Transmuxed and converted to a VT mapped STS-1, inside the DCS without terminating the electrical signal, and sent to the DCS Matrix as a VT mapped STS-1. In the DCS VT Matrix, the VT1.5s would be groomed from any VT mapped STS-1 to any other VT mapped STS-1s that are provisioned in the DCS VT Matrix.

In diagram A, a Traverse DCS is shown receiving mixed traffic into I/O shelves. In those I/O shelves, the signals are prepared to be sent to the central Matrix shelf as VT mapped STSs. In the case of receiving an Electrical DS3, where 28 DS1s were muxed into a DS3 by means of an external M13 multiplexer (like a WideBank28 or TransAccess200), it will connect to an Electrical Tmux port on the I/O shelf to be Electrically Transmuxed. And, when a DS3 is connected to an I/O shelf via an optical OCx signal, the I/O shelf will Optically Transmux the DS3. All the VT mapped STSs from an I/O shelf are then sent to the central DCS Matrix shelf, where VT1.5s (DS1s) are groomed directly from one VT mapped STS1 to another VT mapped STSs in the VT Matrix and sent back out to an I/O shelf for further routing.

== See also ==
- Optical cross-connect
