= Synchronous optical networking =

Standardized protocol

Synchronous Optical Networking (SONET) and Synchronous Digital Hierarchy (SDH) are standardized protocols that transfer multiple digital bit streams synchronously over optical fiber using lasers or highly coherent light from light-emitting diodes (LEDs). At low transmission rates, data can also be transferred via an electrical interface. The method was developed to replace the plesiochronous digital hierarchy (PDH) system for transporting large amounts of telephone calls and data traffic over the same fiber without the problems of synchronization.

SONET and SDH, which are essentially the same, were originally designed to transport circuit mode communications, e.g. DS1, DS3, from a variety of different sources. However, they were primarily designed to support real-time, uncompressed, circuit-switched voice encoded in PCM format. The primary difficulty in doing this prior to SONET/SDH was that the synchronization sources of these various circuits were different. This meant that each circuit was actually operating at a slightly different rate and with different phase. SONET/SDH allowed for the simultaneous transport of many different circuits of differing origin within a single framing protocol. SONET/SDH is not a complete communications protocol in itself, but a transport protocol (not a "transport" in the OSI Model sense).

Due to SONET/SDH's essential protocol neutrality and transport-oriented features, SONET/SDH was the choice for transporting the fixed-length Asynchronous Transfer Mode (ATM) frames also known as cells. It quickly evolved mapping structures and concatenated payload containers to transport ATM connections. In other words, for ATM (and eventually other protocols such as Ethernet), the internal complex structure previously used to transport circuit-oriented connections was removed and replaced with a large and concatenated frame (such as STS-3c) into which ATM cells, IP packets, or Ethernet frames are placed.

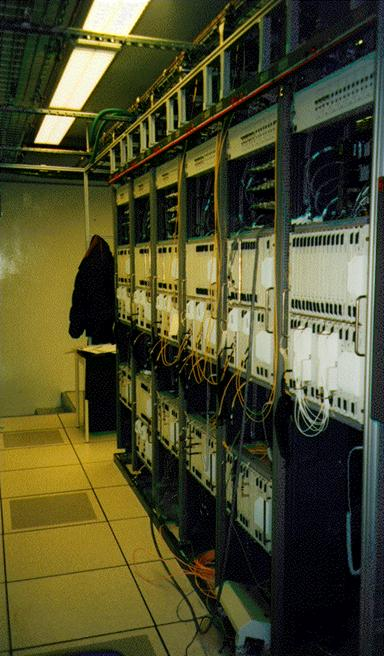
Racks of Alcatel STM-16 SDH add-drop multiplexers

Both SDH and SONET are widely used today: SONET in the United States and Canada, and SDH in the rest of the world. Although the SONET standards were developed before SDH, it is considered a variation of SDH because of SDH's greater worldwide market penetration. SONET is subdivided into four sublayers with some factor such as the path, line, section and physical layer.

The SDH standard was originally defined by the European Telecommunications Standards Institute (ETSI), and is formalised as International Telecommunication Union (ITU) standards G.707, G.783, G.784, and G.803. The SONET standard was defined by Telcordia and American National Standards Institute (ANSI) standard T1.105. which define the set of transmission formats and transmission rates in the range above 51.840 Mbit/s.

== Difference from PDH ==
SDH differs from plesiochronous digital hierarchy (PDH) in that the exact rates that are used to transport the data on SONET/SDH are tightly synchronized across the entire network, using atomic clocks. This synchronization system allows entire inter-country networks to operate synchronously, greatly reducing the amount of buffering required between elements in the network. Both SONET and SDH can be used to encapsulate earlier digital transmission standards, such as the PDH standard, or they can be used to directly support either Asynchronous Transfer Mode (ATM) or so-called packet over SONET/SDH (POS) networking. Therefore, it is inaccurate to think of SDH or SONET as communications protocols in and of themselves; they are generic, all-purpose transport containers for moving both voice and data. The basic format of a SONET/SDH signal allows it to carry many different services in its virtual container (VC), because it is bandwidth-flexible.

== Protocol overview ==
SONET and SDH often use different terms to describe identical features or functions. This can cause confusion and exaggerate their differences. With a few exceptions, SDH can be thought of as a superset of SONET.

SONET is a set of transport containers that allow for delivery of a variety of protocols, including traditional telephony, ATM, Ethernet, and TCP/IP traffic. SONET therefore is not in itself a native communications protocol and should not be confused as being necessarily connection-oriented in the way that term is usually used.

The protocol is a heavily multiplexed structure, with the header interleaved between the data in a complex way. This permits the encapsulated data to have its own frame rate and be able to "float around" relative to the SDH/SONET frame structure and rate. This interleaving permits a very low latency for the encapsulated data. Data passing through equipment can be delayed by at most 32 μs, compared to a frame rate of 125 μs; in many competing protocols, which buffer the data during such transits for at least one frame or packet before sending it on. Extra padding is allowed for the multiplexed data to move within the overall framing, as the data is clocked at a different rate than the frame rate. The protocol is made more complex by the decision to permit this padding at most levels of the multiplexing structure, but it improves all-around performance.

== Basic transmission unit ==
The basic unit of framing in SDH is a STM-1 (Synchronous Transport Module, level 1), which operates at 155.520 megabits per second (Mbit/s). SONET refers to this basic unit as an STS-3c (Synchronous Transport Signal 3, concatenated). When the STS-3c is carried over OC-3, it is often colloquially referred to as OC-3c, but this is not an official designation within the SONET standard as there is no physical layer (i.e. optical) difference between an STS-3c and 3 STS-1s carried within an OC-3.

SONET offers an additional basic unit of transmission, the STS-1 (Synchronous Transport Signal 1) or OC-1, operating at 51.84 Mbit/s—exactly one third of an STM-1/STS-3c/OC-3c carrier. This speed is dictated by the bandwidth requirements for PCM-encoded telephonic voice signals: at this rate, an STS-1/OC-1 circuit can carry the bandwidth equivalent of a standard DS-3 channel, which can carry 672 64-kbit/s voice channels. In SONET, the STS-3c signal is composed of three multiplexed STS-1 signals; the STS-3c may be carried on an OC-3 signal. Some manufacturers also support the SDH equivalent of the STS-1/OC-1, known as STM-0.

=== Framing ===
In packet-oriented data transmission, such as Ethernet, a packet frame usually consists of a header and a payload. The header is transmitted first, followed by the payload (and possibly a trailer, such as a CRC). In synchronous optical networking, this is modified slightly. The header is termed the overhead, and instead of being transmitted before the payload, is interleaved with it during transmission. Part of the overhead is transmitted, then part of the payload, then the next part of the overhead, then the next part of the payload, until the entire frame has been transmitted.

In the case of an STS-1, the frame is 810 octets in size, while the STM-1/STS-3c frame is 2,430 octets in size. For STS-1, the frame is transmitted as three octets of overhead, followed by 87 octets of payload. This is repeated nine times, until 810 octets have been transmitted, taking 125 μs. In the case of an STS-3c/STM-1, which operates three times faster than an STS-1, nine octets of overhead are transmitted, followed by 261 octets of payload. This is also repeated nine times until 2,430 octets have been transmitted, also taking 125 μs. For both SONET and SDH, this is often represented by displaying the frame graphically: as a block of 90 columns and nine rows for STS-1, and 270 columns and nine rows for STM1/STS-3c. This representation aligns all the overhead columns, so the overhead appears as a contiguous block, as does the payload.

The internal structure of the overhead and payload within the frame differs slightly between SONET and SDH, and different terms are used in the standards to describe these structures. Their standards are extremely similar in implementation, making it easy to interoperate between SDH and SONET at any given bandwidth.

In practice, the terms STS-1 and OC-1 are sometimes used interchangeably, though the OC designation refers to the signal in its optical form. It is therefore incorrect to say that an OC-3 contains 3 OC-1s: an OC-3 can be said to contain 3 STS-1s.

=== SDH frame ===
An STM-1 frame. The first nine columns contain the overhead and the pointers. For the sake of simplicity, the frame is shown as a rectangular structure of 270 columns and nine rows but the protocol does not transmit the bytes in this order.

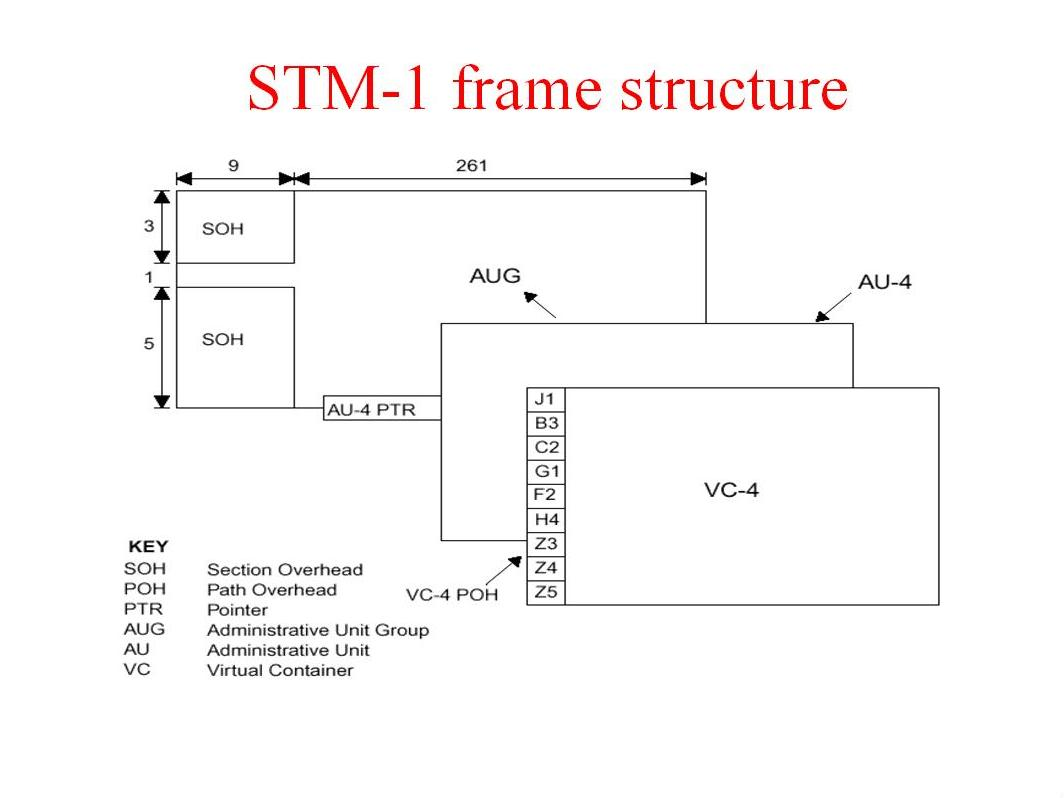
For the sake of simplicity, the frame is shown as a rectangular structure of 270 columns and nine rows. The first three rows and nine columns contain regenerator section overhead (RSOH) and the last five rows and nine columns contain multiplex section overhead (MSOH). The fourth row from the top contains pointers.

The Synchronous Transport Module, level 1 (STM-1) frame is the basic transmission format for SDH—the first level of the synchronous digital hierarchy. The STM-1 frame is transmitted in exactly 125 μs, therefore, there are 8,000 frames per second on a 155.52 Mbit/s OC-3 fiber-optic circuit. (Note: 2,430 octets per frame × 8 bits per octet × 8,000 frames per second = 155.52 Mbit/s) The STM-1 frame consists of overhead and pointers plus information payload. The first nine columns of each frame make up the section overhead and administrative unit pointers, and the last 261 columns make up the information payload. The pointers (H1, H2, H3 bytes) identify administrative units (AU) within the information payload. Thus, an OC-3 circuit can carry 150.336 Mbit/s of payload, after accounting for the overhead. (Note: 2,349 octets of payload per frame × 8 bits per octet × 8,000 frames per second = 150.336 Mbit/s)

Carried within the information payload, which has its own frame structure of nine rows and 261 columns, are administrative units identified by pointers. Also within the administrative unit are one or more virtual containers (VCs). VCs contain path overhead and VC payload. The first column is for path overhead; it is followed by the payload container, which can itself carry other containers. Administrative units can have any phase alignment within the STM frame, and this alignment is indicated by the pointer in row four.

The section overhead (SOH) of a STM-1 signal is divided into two parts: the regenerator section overhead (RSOH) and the multiplex section overhead (MSOH). The overheads contain information from the transmission system itself, which is used for a wide range of management functions, such as monitoring transmission quality, detecting failures, managing alarms, data communication channels, service channels, etc.

The STM frame is continuous and is transmitted in a serial fashion: byte-by-byte, row-by-row.

==== Transport overhead ====
The transport overhead is used for signaling and measuring transmission error rates, and is composed as follows:

Section overhead
Called regenerator section overhead (RSOH) in SDH terminology: 27 octets containing information about the frame structure required by the terminal equipment.
Line overhead
Called multiplex section overhead (MSOH) in SDH: 45 octets containing information about error correction and Automatic Protection Switching messages (e.g., alarms and maintenance messages) as may be required within the network. The error correction is included for STM-16 and above.
Administrative unit (AU) pointer
Points to the location of the J1 byte in the payload (the first byte in the virtual container).

==== Path virtual envelope ====
Data transmitted from end to end is referred to as path data. It is composed of two components:

Payload overhead (POH)
9 octets used for end-to-end signaling and error measurement.
Payload
User data (774 bytes for STM-0/STS-1, or 2,430 octets for STM-1/STS-3c)

For STS-1, the payload is referred to as the synchronous payload envelope (SPE), which in turn has 18 stuffing bytes, leading to the STS-1 payload capacity of 756 bytes.

The STS-1 payload is designed to carry a full PDH DS3 frame. When the DS3 enters a SONET network, path overhead is added, and that SONET network element (NE) is said to be a path generator and terminator. The SONET NE is line terminating if it processes the line overhead. Note that wherever the line or path is terminated, the section is terminated also. SONET regenerators terminate the section, but not the paths or line.

An STS-1 payload can also be subdivided into seven virtual tributary groups (VTGs). Each VTG can then be subdivided into four VT1.5 signals, each of which can carry a PDH DS1 signal. A VTG may instead be subdivided into three VT2 signals, each of which can carry a PDH E1 signal. The SDH equivalent of a VTG is a TUG-2; VT1.5 is equivalent to VC-11, and VT2 is equivalent to VC-12.

Three STS-1 signals may be multiplexed by time-division multiplexing to form the next level of the SONET hierarchy, the OC-3 (STS-3), running at 155.52 Mbit/s. The signal is multiplexed by interleaving the bytes of the three STS-1 frames to form the STS-3 frame, containing 2,430 bytes and transmitted in 125 μs.

Higher-speed circuits are formed by successively aggregating multiples of slower circuits, their speed always being immediately apparent from their designation. For example, four STS-3 or AU4 signals can be aggregated to form a 622.08 Mbit/s signal designated OC-12 or STM-4.

The highest rate commonly deployed is the OC-768 or STM-256 circuit, which operates at rate of just under 38.5 Gbit/s. Where fiber exhaustion is a concern, multiple SONET signals can be transported over multiple wavelengths on a single fiber pair by means of wavelength-division multiplexing, including dense wavelength-division multiplexing (DWDM) and coarse wavelength-division multiplexing (CWDM). DWDM circuits are the basis for all modern submarine communications cable systems and other long-haul circuits.

== SONET/SDH and relationship to 10 Gigabit Ethernet ==
Another type of high-speed data networking circuit is 10 Gigabit Ethernet (10GbE). The Gigabit Ethernet Alliance created two 10 Gigabit Ethernet variants: a local area variant (LAN PHY) with a line rate of 10.3125 Gbit/s, and a wide area variant (WAN PHY) with the same line rate as OC-192/STM-64 (9,953,280 kbit/s).

The WAN PHY variant encapsulates Ethernet data using a lightweight SDH/SONET frame, so as to be compatible at a low level with equipment designed to carry SDH/SONET signals, whereas the LAN PHY variant encapsulates Ethernet data using 64B/66B line coding.

However, 10 Gigabit Ethernet does not explicitly provide any interoperability at the bitstream level with other SDH/SONET systems. This differs from WDM system transponders, including both coarse and dense wavelength-division multiplexing systems (CWDM and DWDM) that currently support OC-192 SONET signals, which can normally support thin-SONET–framed 10 Gigabit Ethernet.

== SONET/SDH data rates ==
SONET/SDH Designations and bandwidths
SONET Optical Carrier level	SONET frame format	SDH level and frame format	Payload bandwidth (Note: line rate minus the bandwidth of the line and section overheads) (kbit/s)	Line rate (kbit/s)
OC-1	STS-1	STM-0	50,112	51,840
OC-3	STS-3	STM-1	150,336	155,520
OC-12	STS-12	STM-4	601,344	622,080
OC-24	STS-24	–	1,202,688	1,244,160
OC-48	STS-48	STM-16	2,405,376	2,488,320
OC-192	STS-192	STM-64	9,621,504	9,953,280
OC-768	STS-768	STM-256	38,486,016	39,813,120

User throughput must not deduct path overhead from the payload bandwidth, but path-overhead bandwidth is variable based on the types of cross-connects built across the optical system.

Note that the data-rate progression starts at 155 Mbit/s and increases by multiples of four. The only exception is OC-24, which is standardized in ANSI T1.105, but not a SDH standard rate in ITU-T G.707. Other rates, such as OC-9, OC-18, OC-36, OC-96, and OC-1536, are defined but not commonly deployed; most are considered orphaned rates.

== Physical layer ==
The physical layer refers to the first layer in the OSI networking model. The ATM and SDH layers are the regenerator section level, digital line level, transmission path level, virtual path level, and virtual channel level. The physical layer is modeled on three major entities: transmission path, digital line and the regenerator section. The regenerator section refers to the section and photonic layers. The photonic layer is the lowest SONET layer and it is responsible for transmitting the bits to the physical medium. The section layer is responsible for generating the proper STS-N frames which are to be transmitted across the physical medium. It deals with issues such as proper framing, error monitoring, section maintenance, and orderwire.

The line layer ensures reliable transport of the payload and overhead generated by the path layer. It provides synchronization and multiplexing for multiple paths. It modifies overhead bits relating to quality control. The path layer is SONET's highest level layer. It takes data to be transmitted and transforms them into signals required by the line layer, and adds or modifies the path overhead bits for performance monitoring and protection switching.

== SONET/SDH network management protocols ==
=== Overall functionality ===
Network management systems are used to configure and monitor SDH and SONET equipment either locally or remotely.

The systems consist of three essential parts, covered later in more detail:

- Software running on a network management system terminal, e.g. workstation, dumb terminal or laptop housed in an exchange/central office.
- Transport of network management data between the network management system terminal and the SONET/SDH equipment, e.g. using TL1/Q3 protocols.
- Transport of network management data between SDH/SONET equipment using dedicated embedded data communication channels (DCCs) within the section and line overhead.

The main functions of network management thereby include:

Network and network-element provisioning
In order to allocate bandwidth throughout a network, each network element must be configured. Although this can be done locally, through a craft interface, it is normally done through a network management system (sitting at a higher layer) that, in turn, operates through the SONET/SDH network management network.
Software upgrade
Network-element software upgrades are done mostly through the SONET/SDH management network in modern equipment.
Performance management
Network elements have a very large set of standards for performance management. The performance-management criteria allow not only monitoring the health of individual network elements, but isolating and identifying most network defects or outages. Higher-layer network monitoring and management software allows the proper filtering and troubleshooting of network-wide performance management, so that defects and outages can be quickly identified and resolved.

Consider the three parts defined above:

=== Network management system terminal ===
Local Craft interface
Local "craftspersons" (telephone network engineers) can access a SDH/SONET network element on a "craft port" and issue commands through a dumb terminal or terminal emulation program running on a laptop. This interface can also be attached to a console server, allowing for remote out-of-band management and logging.

Network management system (sitting at a higher layer)

This will often consist of software running on a Workstation covering a number of SDH/SONET network elements

=== TL1/Q3 Protocols ===
TL1

SONET equipment is often managed with the TL1 protocol. TL1 is a telecom language for managing and reconfiguring SONET network elements. The command language used by a SONET network element, such as TL1, must be carried by other management protocols, such as SNMP, CORBA, or XML.

Q3

SDH has been mainly managed using the Q3 interface protocol suite defined in ITU recommendations Q.811 and Q.812. With the convergence of SONET and SDH on switching matrix and network elements architecture, newer implementations have also offered TL1.

Most SONET NEs have a limited number of management interfaces defined:

TL1 Electrical interface
The electrical interface, often a 50-ohm coaxial cable, sends SONET TL1 commands from a local management network physically housed in the central office where the SONET network element is located. This is for local management of that network element and, possibly, remote management of other SONET network elements.

=== Dedicated embedded data communication channels (DCCs) ===
SONET and SDH have dedicated data communication channels (DCCs) within the section and line overhead for management traffic. Generally, section overhead (regenerator section in SDH) is used. According to ITU-T G.7712, there are three modes used for management:
- IP-only stack, using PPP as data-link
- OSI-only stack, using LAP-D as data-link
- Dual (IP+OSI) stack using PPP or LAP-D with tunneling functions to communicate between stacks.

To handle all of the possible management channels and signals, most modern network elements contain a router for the network commands and underlying (data) protocols.

== Equipment ==
With advances in SONET and SDH chipsets, the traditional categories of network elements are no longer distinct. Nevertheless, as network architectures have remained relatively constant, even newer equipment (including multi-service provisioning platforms) can be examined in light of the architectures they will support. Thus, there is value in viewing new, as well as traditional, equipment in terms of the older categories.

=== Regenerator ===
Traditional regenerators terminate the section overhead, but not the line or path. Regenerators extend long-haul routes in a way similar to most regenerators, by converting an optical signal that has already traveled a long distance into electrical format and then retransmitting a regenerated high-power signal.

Since the late 1990s, regenerators have been largely replaced by optical amplifiers. Also, some of the functionality of regenerators has been absorbed by the transponders of wavelength-division multiplexing systems.

=== STS multiplexer and demultiplexer ===
STS multiplexer and demultiplexer provide the interface between an electrical tributary network and the optical network.

=== Add-drop multiplexer ===
Add-drop multiplexers (ADMs) are the most common type of network elements. Traditional ADMs were designed to support one of the network architectures, though new generation systems can often support several architectures, sometimes simultaneously. ADMs traditionally have a high-speed side (where the full line rate signal is supported), and a low-speed side, which can consist of electrical as well as optical interfaces. The low-speed side takes in low-speed signals, which are multiplexed by the network element and sent out from the high-speed side, or vice versa.

=== Digital cross connect system ===
Recent digital cross connect systems (DCSs or DXCs) support numerous high-speed signals, and allow for cross-connection of DS1s, DS3s and even STS-3s/12c and so on, from any input to any output. Advanced DCSs can support numerous subtending rings simultaneously.

== Network architectures ==
SONET and SDH have a limited number of architectures defined. These architectures allow for efficient bandwidth usage as well as protection, i.e. the ability to transmit traffic even when part of the network has failed, and are fundamental to the worldwide deployment of SONET and SDH for moving digital traffic. Every SDH/SONET connection on the optical physical layer uses two optical fibers, regardless of the transmission speed.

=== Linear Automatic Protection Switching ===
Linear Automatic Protection Switching (APS), also known as 1+1, involves four fibers: two working fibers (one in each direction), and two protection fibers. Switching is based on the line state, and may be unidirectional (with each direction switching independently), or bidirectional (where the network elements at each end negotiate so that both directions are generally carried on the same pair of fibers).

=== Unidirectional path-switched ring ===
In unidirectional path-switched rings (UPSRs), two redundant (path-level) copies of protected traffic are sent in either direction around a ring. A selector at the egress node determines which copy has the highest quality, and uses that copy, thus coping if one copy deteriorates due to a broken fiber or other failure.

UPSRs tend to sit nearer to the edge of a network, and as such are sometimes called collector rings. Because the same data is sent around the ring in both directions, the total capacity of a UPSR is equal to the line rate N of the OC-N ring. For example, in an OC-3 ring with 3 STS-1s used to transport 3 DS-3s from ingress node A to the egress node D, 100 percent of the ring bandwidth (N=3) would be consumed by nodes A and D. Any other nodes on the ring could only act as pass-through nodes. The SDH equivalent of UPSR is subnetwork connection protection (SNCP); SNCP does not impose a ring topology, but may also be used in mesh topologies.

=== Bidirectional line-switched ring ===
Bidirectional line-switched ring (BLSR) comes in two varieties: two-fiber BLSR and four-fiber BLSR. BLSRs switch at the line layer. Unlike UPSR, BLSR does not send redundant copies from ingress to egress. Rather, the ring nodes adjacent to the failure reroute the traffic "the long way" around the ring on the protection fibers. BLSRs trade cost and complexity for bandwidth efficiency, as well as the ability to support "extra traffic" that can be pre-empted when a protection switching event occurs. In four-fiber ring, either single node failures, or multiple line failures can be supported, since a failure or maintenance action on one line causes the protection fiber connecting two nodes to be used rather than looping it around the ring.

BLSRs can operate within a metropolitan region or, often, will move traffic between municipalities. Because a BLSR does not send redundant copies from ingress to egress, the total bandwidth that a BLSR can support is not limited to the line rate N of the OC-N ring, and can actually be larger than N depending upon the traffic pattern on the ring.

In the best case, all traffic is between adjacent nodes. The worst case is when all traffic on the ring egresses from a single node, i.e., the BLSR is serving as a collector ring. In this case, the bandwidth that the ring can support is equal to the line rate N of the OC-N ring. This is why BLSRs are seldom, if ever, deployed in collector rings, but often deployed in inter-office rings. The SDH equivalent of BLSR is called Multiplex Section-Shared Protection Ring (MS-SPRING).

== Synchronization ==
Clock sources used for synchronization in telecommunications networks are rated by quality, commonly called a stratum. Typically, a network element uses the highest quality stratum available to it, which can be determined by monitoring the synchronization status messages (SSM) of selected clock sources.

Synchronization sources available to a network element are:

Local external timing
This is generated by an atomic cesium clock or a satellite-derived clock by a device in the same central office as the network element. The interface is often a DS1, with sync-status messages supplied by the clock and placed into the DS1 overhead.
Line-derived timing
A network element can choose (or be configured) to derive its timing from the line-level, by monitoring the S1 sync-status bytes to ensure quality.
Holdover
As a last resort, in the absence of higher quality timing, a network element can go into a holdover mode until higher-quality external timing becomes available again. In this mode, the network element uses its own timing circuits as a reference.

=== Timing loops ===
A timing loop occurs when network elements in a network are each deriving their timing from other network elements, without any of them being a "master" timing source. This network loop will eventually see its own timing "float away" from any external networks, causing mysterious bit errors—and ultimately, in the worst cases, massive loss of traffic. The source of these kinds of errors can be hard to diagnose. In general, a network that has been properly configured should never find itself in a timing loop, but some classes of silent failures could nevertheless cause this issue.

== Next-generation SONET/SDH ==
SONET/SDH development was originally driven by the need to transport multiple PDH signals—like DS1, E1, DS3, and E3—along with other groups of multiplexed 64 kbit/s pulse-code modulated voice traffic. The ability to transport ATM traffic was another early application. In order to support large ATM bandwidths, concatenation was developed, whereby smaller multiplexing containers (e.g., STS-1) are inversely multiplexed to build up a larger container (e.g., STS-3c) to support large data-oriented pipes.

One problem with traditional concatenation, however, is inflexibility. Depending on the data and voice traffic mix that must be carried, there can be a large amount of unused bandwidth left over, due to the fixed sizes of concatenated containers. For example, fitting a 100 Mbit/s Fast Ethernet connection inside a 155 Mbit/s STS-3c container leads to considerable waste. More important is the need for all intermediate network elements to support newly introduced concatenation sizes. This problem was overcome with the introduction of Virtual Concatenation.

Virtual concatenation (VCAT) allows for a more arbitrary assembly of lower-order multiplexing containers, building larger containers of fairly arbitrary size (e.g., 100 Mbit/s) without the need for intermediate network elements to support this particular form of concatenation. Virtual concatenation leverages the X.86 or Generic Framing Procedure (GFP) protocols in order to map payloads of arbitrary bandwidth into the virtually concatenated container.

The Link Capacity Adjustment Scheme (LCAS) allows for dynamically changing the bandwidth via dynamic virtual concatenation, multiplexing containers based on the short-term bandwidth needs in the network.

The set of next-generation SONET/SDH protocols that enable Ethernet transport is referred to as Ethernet over SONET/SDH (EoS).

== End of life and retirement ==
SONET/SDH was used by internet access providers for large customers, and is no longer competitive in the supply of private circuits. Development has stagnated for the last decade (2020) and both suppliers of equipment and operators of SONET/SDH networks are migrating to other technologies such as OTN and wide area Ethernet.

British Telecom has recently (March 2020) closed down their KiloStream and Mega Stream products which were the last large scale uses of the BT SDH. BT has also ceased new connections to their SDH network which indicates withdrawal of services soon.

== See also ==
- Mesochronous network
- Multiwavelength optical networking
- Optical mesh network
- Optical transport network
- Phase-locked loop
- Remote error indication
- Routing and wavelength assignment
- Transmux
