= Automatic switched-transport network =

Computer network protocol

Automatic Switched Transport Network (ASTN) allows traffic paths to be set up through a switched network automatically. The term ASTN replaces the term ASON (Automatically Switched Optical Network) and is often used interchangeably with GMPLS (Generalized MPLS). This is not completely correct as GMPLS is a family of protocols, but ASON/ASTN is an optical/transport network architecture. The requirements of the ASON/ASTN architecture can be satisfied using GMPLS protocols developed by the IETF or by GMPLS protocols that have been modified by the ITU. Furthermore, the GMPLS protocols are applicable to optical and non-optical (e.g., packet and frame) networks, and can be used in transport or client networks. Thus, GMPLS is a wider concept than ASTN.

Traditionally, creating traffic paths through a series of Network Elements has involved configuration of individual cross-connects on each Network Element. ASTN allows the user to specify the start point, end point and bandwidth required, and the ASTN agent on the Network Elements will allocate the path through the network, provisioning the traffic path, setting up cross-connects, and allocating bandwidth from the paths for the user requested service. The actual path that the traffic will take through the network is not specified by the user.

Changes to the network (adding/removing nodes) will be taken into account by the ASTN agents in the network, but do not need to be considered by the user. This gives the user far more flexibility when allocating user bandwidth to provide services demanded by the customer.

GMPLS consist of several protocols, including routing protocols (OSPF-TE or ISIS-TE), link management protocols (LMP), and a reservation/label distribution protocol (RSVP-TE). The reservation/label distribution protocol CR-LDP has now been deprecated by the IETF in RFC 3468 (February 2003) and IETF GMPLS working group decided to focus purely on RSVP-TE.

The GMPLS architecture is defined in RFC 3945.
