= Layer 2 MPLS VPN =

Type of virtual private network

Logical View of a Layer 2 MPLS VPN.

A Layer 2 MPLS VPN is a term in computer networking. It is a method that Internet service providers use to segregate their network for their customers, to allow them to transmit data over an IP network. This is often sold as a service to businesses.

Layer 2 VPNs are a type of Virtual Private Network (VPN) that uses MPLS labels to transport data. The communication occurs between routers that are known as Provider Edge routers (PE routers), as they sit on the edge of the provider's network, next to the customer's network.

Internet providers who have an existing Layer 2 network (such as ATM or Frame Relay) may choose to use these VPNs instead of the other common MPLS VPN, Layer 3. There is no one IETF standard for Layer 2 MPLS VPNs. Instead, two methodologies may be used. Both methods use a standard MPLS header to encapsulate data. However, they differ in their signaling protocols.

== Types of Layer 2 MPLS VPNs ==
=== BGP-based ===
The BGP-based type is based on the informational RFC 6624 by Kireeti Kompella from Juniper Networks. It uses the Border Gateway Protocol (BGP) as the mechanism for PE routers to communicate with each other about their customer connections. Each router connects to a central cloud, using BGP. This means that when new customers are added (usually to new routers), the existing routers will communicate with each other, via BGP, and automatically add the new customers to the service.

=== LDP-based ===
The second type is based on the Internet Standard RFC 8077 (Note: Obsoletes the previous identically named RFC 4447) by Chandan Mishra from Cisco Systems. This method is also known as a Layer 2 circuit. It uses the Label Distribution Protocol (LDP) to communicate between PE routers. In this case, every LDP-speaking router will exchange FECs (forwarding equivalence classes) and establish LSPs with every other LDP-speaking router on the network (or just the other PE router, in the case when LDP is tunnelled over RSVP-TE), which differs from the BGP-based methodology. The LDP-based style of layer 2 VPN defines new TLVs and parameters for LDP to aid in the signaling of the VPNs.

== Vendor implementations ==
- Nokia: LDP based and BGP-based (7950, 7750, 7250 series)
- Foundry Networks: LDP-based (NetIron XMR Series, NetIron MLX Series)
- Juniper Networks: BGP-based (MX/M/T/J-series)
- Juniper Networks: LDP-based (MX/M/T/J/E-series)
- Cisco Systems: LDP-based (IOS)
- Cisco Systems: LDP-based and BGP-based (IOS XR)
- Cisco Systems: LDP-Based [BGP-DISC]
- MRV communications: LDP-based
- Lucent Technologies (formerly Riverstone Networks): LDP-based
- Ericsson (formerly Redback Networks): LDP-based
- Huawei Technologies: LDP-based & BGP-based (NE/S-series)
- ZTE:LDP-based & BGP-based (ZXCTN6000/9000 series, ZXR10 series)
