= Adrian Farrel =

British engineer and author

Adrian Farrel is a British engineer and author, specialising in developing computer network protocols for the Internet. He is active in the Internet Engineering Task Force.

He was a founder of Aria Networks Ltd, who manufacture sophisticated, next-generation network modelling, path computation, and optimisation tools for MPLS, GMPLS, and IP networks, and served as their Chief Technology Officer for two years. He also runs a consulting company specialising in MPLS and GMPLS. Previously he was an MPLS architect and development manager at software house Data Connection Ltd., and director of protocol development for Movaz Networks Inc. He also co-authored a research paper.

== Biography ==
Adrian Farrel is the co-chair of the IETF's: L2VPN Service Model (L2SM) working group. He was previously a Routing Area Director in the IETF, and was sponsored for this activity by Juniper Networks. Formerly he was co-chair of five IETF working groups, namely the L3VPN Service Model (L3SM) working group, the Interface to Network Service Functions (I2NSF) working group, CCAMP, PCE, and L1VPN, which are responsible for developing GMPLS and MPLS related standards. He has authored or co-authored more than 50 Request for Comments (RFCs) the IETF's standards documents making him equal 10th most prolific author in the IETF with an h-index of 12. On 18 October 2017 he was appointed Independent Submission Editor (ISE) for the RFC Editor to serve for two years beginning on 15 February 2018.

He co-edited a special edition of the IEEE Communications Magazine on GMPLS and is the author of a number of books.

From 2008 to 2011 Adrian served as a Trustee and member of the Standing Board of the Llangollen International Eisteddfod

Farrel was on the Technical Program Committee for the 15th Annual Conference MPLS in 2012 and again in 2014 as one of two Routing Area Directors in the Internet Engineering Task Force.

=== Other activities ===
Adrian Farrel is a member of the Pirate Party UK, and since 4 July 2015 has been an elected Governor of the party. On 14 December 2016 he was appointed chair of the Board of Governors, a position he held until the party was disbanded at the end of 2020.

Adrian has also authored four volumes of fairy tales. He blogs about fairy tales and fairy stories.

== Books ==
- Tales from the Castle (FeedARead, 2019), ISBN 9781788768375
- Tales from Beyond the Wood (FeedARead, 2017), ISBN 9781788760096
- More Tales from the Wood (FeedARead, 2016), ISBN 9781786972569
- Tales from the Wood (FeedARead, 2015), ISBN 9781786100924
- Wireless Networking Complete (with multiple authors, Morgan Kaufmann Publishers, Burlington: 2009), ISBN 0123750776
- Network Management: Know It All (Morgan Kaufmann Publishers, Burlington: 2008), ISBN 0123745985
- Network Quality of Service: Know It All (Morgan Kaufmann Publishers, Burlington: 2008), ISBN 0323281877
- MPLS: Next Steps (with Bruce S. Davie, Morgan Kaufmann Publishers, Burlington: 2008), ISBN 0123744008
- GMPLS: Architecture and Applications (with Igor Bryskin, Morgan Kaufmann Publishers, Burlington: 2005), ISBN 0120884224
- The Internet and Its Protocols: A Comparative Approach (Morgan Kaufmann Publishers, Burlington: 2004), ISBN 155860913X
