= Customer edge router =

Customer-side networking device

MPLS VPN network diagram with wikilinks

The customer edge (CE) router generally refers to the router at the customer premises that is interconnected with the provider edge (PE) router of a service provider's IP/MPLS network.

The CE router may peer with the PE router and exchanges routes with the corresponding VRF inside the PE for L3VPN services, or it may be connected to utilise L2VPN service provided by the provider. The routing protocol used could be static or dynamic (an interior gateway protocol like OSPF or an exterior gateway protocol like BGP).

The customer edge router can either be owned by the customer or service provider.

== Residential broadband ==
In the case of residential broadband internet services, the service provider or ISP, will often use MPLS internally to transport the broadband customer's layer 2 traffic over the MPLS core, back to their BNGs. In this case, the customer's router can be referred to as a customer premises equipment (CPE) device, where CPE is typically a layer 3 routing device; however, CE router is also valid.

== See also ==
- Provider edge router
- Provider router
