= TSD =

TSD may refer to:

== Businesses and organizations ==
- TSD Desalination, an Israeli start-up
- Telluride School District R-1
- Texas School for the Deaf, U.S.
- Transylvanian Society of Dracula
- Turin School of Development, Italy
- University of Wales Trinity Saint David, a university in the U.K.

== Government ==
- Technical Services Division, another term for the U.S. CIA's Office of Technical Service
- Treatment, Storage, and Disposal Facility; see HAZWOPER
- Treasury Solicitor's Department, U.K.
- Trilateral Security Dialogue, part of the Quadrilateral Security Dialogue
- Technical Support Division ad hoc Indian Army Intelligence Unit.

== Science and medicine ==
- Target-to-skin distance, a measurement in external beam radiotherapy
- Tay–Sachs disease, a genetic disorder, fatal in its most common variant
- Temperature-dependent sex determination
- Thermionic specific detector, another term for nitrogen–phosphorus detector
- Total sleep deprivation, a parameter in sleep and memory studies

== Other uses ==
- TSD (band), a 1990s girl band
- TSD rally (time-speed-distance), a type of motorsport rally
- ISO 639:tsd or Tsakonian, a modern Hellenic language which is highly divergent from other spoken varieties of Modern Greek
- Tang Soo Do, a Korean martial art
- Text, Speech and Dialogue, an international conference held in the Czech Republic
- Toshiba Telecommunication Systems Division, Irvine, California
- Turtle saving device, another term for turtle excluder device
