= TLDP =

TLDP or tLDP may refer to:

- The Linux Documentation Project
- targeted Label Distribution Protocol
- The Last Dinner Party, a British indie rock band
