= SSR =

SSR or S.S.R. may refer to:

== Businesses, entertainment, and products ==
- Solid State Records, a Christian record label
- Chevrolet SSR, a Chevrolet small truck
- Disney's Saratoga Springs Resort & Spa
- Small Screen Rendering, a technology part of Opera Mini
- Sonic and the Secret Rings, a 2007 platform video game
- Stephen's Sausage Roll, a 2016 puzzle video game
- Sirius Satellite Radio, a satellite radio service operating in North America
- Strategic Scientific Reserve, a fictional organization in Marvel Comics and precursor to the fictional organization S.H.I.E.L.D.
- SSR Wheels, a Japanese wheel manufacturer
- SSR Mining (ASX stock ticker symbol SSR)

== Geographical locations ==
- Soviet Socialist Republic, any one of the Union Republics of the Soviet Union
- Slovak Soviet Republic (1919), a very short-lived communist state in south and eastern Slovakia
- Slovak Socialist Republic, the official name of Slovakia from 1969 to 1990
- Second Spanish Republic

== Railways ==
- Sabah State Railway, a railway in Malaysia
- Southern Shorthaul Railroad, an Australian provider of motive power hauling trains in New South Wales and Victoria, and freight train operator
- Southern Suburbs Railway, a New MetroRail project in Perth, Western Australia
- Springfield Street Railway, a former interurban street railway in Springfield, Massachusetts
- Strategic steam reserve, a collection of steam locomotives retained for use in a national emergency
- Sub-surface railways, cut-and-cover railway lines forming part of the London Underground; also called sub-surface lines

== Science and technology ==
- Scalable Sample Rate, used in MPEG-4 Part 3 and MPEG-2 Part 7
- Scalable Source Routing, a routing algorithm for unstructured networks
- Screen Space Reflections, in computer graphics reflection
- Secondary surveillance radar, a radar system used in air traffic control
- Simple Sequence Repeat, repeating sequences of 2-6 base pairs of DNA
- Site-specific recombination, a type of genetic recombination in which DNA strand exchange takes place between segments possessing only a limited degree of sequence homology
- Slope stability radar, the application for the monitoring of slope stability at open-cut mines
- Solid-state relay, an electronic switching device in which a small control signal controls a larger load current or voltage
- Sources, sinks and reservoirs, for greenhouse gases
- Stable salt reactor, a proposed low-cost nuclear reactor design
- Sum of squared residuals
- Sum of squares due to regression
- Server-side rendering, using a web server to deliver a customized HTML file for a user (client)
- State-space representation, a particular type of a mathematical model of a physical system, used in control engineering and in satellite navigation

== People ==
- S. S. Rajamouli (born 1973), Indian film director
- S. S. Rajendran (1928–2014), Indian actor
- Sushant Singh Rajput (1986–2020), Indian actor
- Singeetam Srinivasa Rao (born 1931), Indian film director

== Other uses ==
- SRG SSR, (Societad Svizra da Radio e Televisiun, abbreviation of the Swiss Broadcasting Corporation in the Romansh language
- Sainik School, Rewa, a senior secondary school in India
- Security sector reform, a process to amend a security sector towards good governance
- The South Saskatchewan Regiment, a Canadian infantry regiment
- Special Support and Reconnaissance Company, a Danish military unit
- The Structure of Scientific Revolutions, a 1962 book by Thomas Kuhn
- The obsolete United States Navy hull classification symbol for a diesel-electric radar picket submarine
- Sustained silent reading, a form of school-based recreational reading
- Self Supporting Run-flat tires, a type of run-flat tire
- Svenska Scoutrådet, the national Scouting and Guiding federation of Sweden
- In air travel passenger name records, a Special Service Request
- Same-sex relationship
- Short-sale restriction, a modified uptick rule instituted by the U.S. Securities and Exchange Commission (SEC) in 2010
- Somali State Resistance, a rebel group in Ethiopia
