= VLL =

VLL may refer to:

- Virtual leased line, an Ethernet-based communication over IP/MPLS networks
- Visual Light Link, a component of a Lego robotics kit
- Valladolid Airport's IATA code
