= Source routing =

Allows a sender specify the route the packet takes through the network

In computer networking, source routing, also called path addressing, allows a sender of a data packet to partially or completely specify the route the packet takes through the network. In contrast, in conventional routing, routers in the network determine the path incrementally based on the packet's destination. Another routing alternative, label switching, is used in connection-oriented networks such as X.25, Frame Relay, Asynchronous Transfer Mode and Multiprotocol Label Switching.

Source routing allows easier troubleshooting, improved traceroute, and enables a node to discover all the possible routes to a host. It does not allow a source to directly manage network performance by forcing packets to travel over one path to prevent congestion on another.

Many high-performance interconnects including Myrinet, Quadrics, IEEE 1355, and SpaceWire support source routing.

== Internet Protocol ==
In the Internet Protocol, two header options are available which are rarely used: "strict source and record route" (SSRR) and "loose source and record route" (LSRR). Because of security concerns, packets marked LSRR are frequently blocked on the Internet. If not blocked, LSRR can allow an attacker to spoof an address but still successfully receive response packets by forcing return traffic for spoofed packets to return through the attacker's device.

In IPv6, two forms of source routing have been developed. The first approach was the Type 0 Routing header. This routing header was designed to support the same use cases as the IPv4 header options. As there were several significant attacks against this routing header, its utilisation was deprecated. A more secure form of source routing was being developed within the IETF as of 2017 to support the IPv6 version of segment routing.

== Software-defined networking ==
Software-defined networking can also be enhanced when source routing is used in the forwarding plane. Studies have shown significant improvements in convergence times as a result of the reduced state that must be distributed by the controller into the network.

== Myrinet ==
When using source routing with Myrinet, the sender of the packet prepends the complete route, one byte for every crossbar, to each packet header. Each crossbar examines the first routing byte of the packet. When using source routing, that byte indicates a particular port of that crossbar; when that port becomes available, the router discards that routing byte and sends the rest of the packet out that port.

== SpaceWire ==
Each packet traveling through a SpaceWire network can use path addressing (source routing) or logical addressing or some combination. The router examines the first data character of the packet; when it indicates some specific port of the router, the router discards that routing character and sends the rest of the packet out that port.

== See also ==
- Bang path
- Dynamic Source Routing
- Policy-based routing can also be used to route packets using their source addresses.
- Scalable Source Routing
