= PCEP =

PCEP may refer to:

== Places ==
- Plymouth–Canton Educational Park

== Transit ==
- Peninsula Corridor Electrification Project, the plan to electrify the Caltrain right-of-way between San Francisco and San Jose

== Computing ==
- Path Computation Element Communications Protocol, a computer network routing protocol
