= SR6 =

SR6 may refer to:

- SR postcode area
- FYFT SR-series unmanned blimp
- 3190 Aposhanskij
- Stinson SR-6 Reliant
- IPv6 Segment routing

== See also ==
- List of highways numbered 6
