= Constraint-based Routing Label Distribution Protocol =

Computer network control protocol

Constraint-based Routing Label Distribution Protocol (CR-LDP) is a control protocol used in some computer networks. As of February 2003, the IETF MPLS working group deprecated CR-LDP and decided to focus purely on RSVP-TE.

It is an extension of the Label Distribution Protocol (LDP), one of the protocols in the Multiprotocol Label Switching architecture. CR-LDP contains extensions for LDP to extend its capabilities such as setup paths beyond what is available for the routing protocol. For instance, a label-switched path can be set up based on explicit route constraints, quality of service constraints, and other constraints. Constraint-based routing (CR) is a mechanism used to meet traffic engineering requirements. These requirements are met by extending LDP for support of constraint-based routed label-switched paths (CR-LSPs). Other uses for CR-LSPs include MPLS-based virtual private networks. CR-LDP is almost same as basic LDP, in packet structure, but it contains some extra TLVs which basically set up the constraint-based LSP.
