= Label Information Base =

Software table

Label Information Base (LIB) is the software table maintained by IP/MPLS capable routers to store the details of port and the corresponding MPLS router label to be popped/pushed on incoming/outgoing MPLS packets.

Entries are populated from label-distribution protocols.

LDP is a protocol that automatically generates and exchanges labels between routers. Each router will locally generate labels for its prefixes and will then advertise the label values to its neighbors. It's a standard, based on Cisco's proprietary TDP (Tag Distribution Protocol). Nowadays almost everyone uses LDP instead of TDP.

LDP first establishes a neighbor adjacency before it exchanges label information. It works a bit differently than most protocols though. LIB functions in the control plane of router's MPLS layer. It is used by the label distribution protocol for mapping the next hop labels.
