= Provider edge router =

Type of router

MPLS VPN network diagram with wikilinks

A provider edge router (PE router) is a router between one network service provider's area and areas administered by other network providers. A network provider is usually an Internet service provider as well (or only that).

The term PE router covers equipment capable of a broad range of routing protocols, notably:

- Border Gateway Protocol (BGP) (PE to PE or PE to CE communication)
- Open Shortest Path First (OSPF) (PE to CE router communication)
- Multiprotocol Label Switching (MPLS) (CE to PE (ingress eLSR) or PE to CE (egress eLSR), also PE to P (and visa versa))

PE routers do not need to be aware of what kind of traffic is coming from the provider's network, as opposed to a P router that functions as a transit within the service provider's network. However, some PE routers also do labelling.

== See also ==
- Customer edge router
- Provider router
