= T-MPLS =

Transport multiprotocol label switching (T-MPLS) is a transport network layer technology that uses extensions to a subset of the existing MPLS standards and is designed specifically for application in transport networks. Work to define T-MPLS was started by the ITU-T in February 2006. It was intended specifically as a connection-oriented packet-switched (co-ps) application offering a simpler implementation by removing MPLS features that are not relevant to co-ps applications and adding mechanisms that provide support of critical transport functionality.

ITU-T ceased work on T-MPLS in December 2008, in favour of MPLS-TP standardization.

T-MPLS uses the same architectural principles of layered networking that are used in other technologies like SDH and OTN. Service providers have already developed management processes and work procedures based on these principles for use in networks that use those other technologies.

In this way T-MPLS was intended to provide a reliable packet-based technology that is familiar and also aligned with circuit-based transport networking; it supports current organizational processes and large-scale work procedures.

T-MPLS is a low cost Layer 2 technology that provides QoS, end-to-end OA&M and protection switching.

The following ITU-T Recommendations exist for T-MPLS. These Recommendations will be superseded (i.e., replaced) by new revisions that apply to MPLS-TP and reference the joint work being undertaken by the ITU-T and IETF.

Recommendation	Title
G.8110.1	Architecture of Transport MPLS (T-MPLS) Layer Network
G.8112	Interfaces for the Transport MPLS (T-MPLS) Hierarchy
G.8121	Characteristics of Transport MPLS equipment functional blocks
G.8131	Linear protection switching for Transport MPLS (T-MPLS) networks
Y.Sup4 ex G.8113 (draft)	Requirements for OAM function in T-MPLS based networks

A further set of ITU-T Recommendations were at a draft stage when work on T-MPLS was halted. These may be resumed at a later stage to reference the material developed as part of the MPLS-TP effort.

Draft Recommendation	Title
G.8114 (draft)	Operation & Maintenance mechanisms for T-MPLS layer networks
G.8132 (draft)	Shared Protection Ring switching for T-MPLS networks

After IETF raised concerns over T-MPLS technology, mainly about incompatibility with the already established IP/MPLS, the ITU-T and the IETF started a joint activity to solve potential issues. The decision was to transfer control to IETF to develop a new MPLS profile specialized for transport (MPLS-TP) with input from ITU recommendations A new activity was added to the charter of the MPLS working group of IETF.
