= Morgan Kaufmann Publishers =

American computer science and engineering content publisher

- Parent company: Elsevier
- Founded: 1984
- Founder: Michael B. Morgan and William Kaufmann
- Country of origin: United States
- Headquarters location: Burlington, Massachusetts
- Publication types: Books
- Official website: www.elsevier.com/books-and-journals/ms-mann

Morgan Kaufmann Publishers is a Burlington, Massachusetts (San Francisco, California until 2008) based publisher specializing in computer science and engineering content.

Since 1984, Morgan Kaufmann has been publishing content on information technology, computer architecture, data management, computer networking, computer systems, human computer interaction, computer graphics, multimedia information and systems, artificial intelligence, computer security, and software engineering. Morgan Kaufmann's audience includes the research and development communities, information technology (IS/IT) managers, and students in professional degree programs.

The company was founded in 1984 by publishers Michael B. Morgan and William Kaufmann and computer scientist Nils Nilsson. It was held privately until 1998, when it was acquired by Harcourt General and became an imprint of the Academic Press, a subsidiary of Harcourt. Harcourt was acquired by Reed Elsevier in 2001; Morgan Kaufmann is now an imprint of the Science and Technology division of Elsevier.

== Notable authors ==
- Adrian Farrel
- Michael L. Scott
