= Ingress router =

An ingress router is a label switch router that is a starting point (source) for a given label-switched path (LSP). An ingress router may be an egress router or an intermediate router for any other LSP(s). Hence the role of ingress and egress routers is LSP specific. Usually, the MPLS label is attached with an IP packet at the ingress router and removed at the egress router, whereas label swapping is performed on the intermediate routers. However, in special cases (such as LSP Hierarchy in RFC 4206, LSP Stitching and MPLS local protection) the ingress router could be pushing label in label stack of an already existing MPLS packet (instead of an IP packet). Note that, although the ingress router is the starting point of an LSP, it may or may not be the source of the under-lying IP packets.
