= Constrained Shortest Path First =

Constrained Shortest Path First (CSPF) is an extension of shortest path algorithms. The path computed using CSPF is a shortest path fulfilling a set of constraints. It simply means that it runs shortest path algorithm after pruning those links that violate a given set of constraints. A constraint could be minimum bandwidth required per link (also known as bandwidth guaranteed constraint), end-to-end delay, maximum number of links traversed, include/exclude nodes. CSPF is widely used in MPLS Traffic Engineering. The routing using CSPF is known as Constraint Based Routing (CBR).

The path computed using CSPF could be exactly same as that of computed from OSPF and IS-IS, or it could be completely different depending on the set of constraints to be met.

== Example with bandwidth constraint ==
An Example network

Consider the network to the right, where a route has to be computed from router-A to the router-C satisfying bandwidth constrained of x- units, and link cost for each link is based on hop-count (i.e., 1).

If x = 50 units then CSPF will give path A → B → C.

If x = 55 units then CSPF will give path A → D → E → C.

If x = 90 units then CSPF will give path A → D → E → F → C.

In all of these cases OSPF and IS-IS will result in path A → B → C.

However, if the link costs in this topology are different, CSPF may accordingly determine a different path. For example, suppose that as before, hop count is used as link cost for all links but A → B and B → C, for which the cost is 4. In this case:

If x = 50 units then CSPF will give path A → D → E → C.

If x = 55 units then CSPF will give path A → D → E → C.

If x = 90 units then CSPF will give path A → D → E → F → C.
