= Forwarding equivalence class =

Set of network packets which may be forwarded the same way

In computer networking, a forwarding equivalence class (FEC) is a term used in Multiprotocol Label Switching (MPLS) to describe a set of packets with similar or identical characteristics which may be forwarded the same way; that is, they may be bound to the same MPLS label.

Characteristics determining the FEC of a higher-layer packet depend on the configuration of the router, but typically this is at least the destination IP address. Quality of service class is also often used. Thus, a forward equivalence class tends to correspond to a label-switched path (LSP). The reverse is not true, however: an LSP may be (and usually is) used for multiple FECs.
