= HSMP LSP =

HSMP LSP is hub & spoke multipoint Label Switched Path (LSP), which allows traffic both from root to leaf through point-to-multipoint (P2MP) LSP and also leaf to root along the reverse path. That means traffic entering the HSMP LSP from application/customer at the root node travels downstream to each leaf node, exactly as if it is travelling downstream along a P2MP LSP to each leaf node. Upstream traffic entering the HSMP LSP at any leaf node travels upstream along the tree to the root, as if it is unicast to the root. Direct communication among the leaf nodes is not allowed.

HSMP LSP is an MPLS Technology, and it is one kind of multipoint Label Switched Path (LSP). Other kinds of multipoint Label Switched Path (LSP) will include: P2MP LSP and MP2MP LSP.

IETF MPLS Working Group is standardizing the HSMP LSP. The LDP based HSMP LSP is standardized in http://tools.ietf.org/html/draft-ietf-mpls-mldp-hsmp-06. The RSVP-TE based HSMP LSP is standardized in http://tools.ietf.org/html/draft-ietf-mpls-rsvp-te-hsmp-lsp-01.

HSMP LSP could be used in various scenarios, e.g., IEEE 1588 time synchronization, P2MP LSP protection, etc.
