= MPLS-TP =

In telecommunications, Multiprotocol Label Switching - Transport Profile (MPLS-TP) is a variant of the MPLS protocol that is used in packet switched data networks. MPLS-TP is the product of a joint Internet Engineering Task Force (IETF) / International Telecommunication Union Telecommunication Standardization Sector (ITU-T) effort to include an MPLS Transport Profile within the IETF MPLS and PWE3 architectures to support the capabilities and functionalities of a packet transport network.

== Description ==
MPLS-TP is designed for use as a network layer technology in transport networks. It will be a continuation of the work started by the transport network experts of the ITU-T, specifically SG15, as T-MPLS. Since 2008 the work is progressed in a cooperation between ITU-T and IETF. The required protocol extensions to MPLS being designed by the IETF based on requirements provided by service providers. It will be a connection-oriented packet-switched (CO-PS) application. It will offer a dedicated MPLS implementation by removing features that are not relevant to CO-PS applications and adding mechanisms that provide support of critical transport functionality.

MPLS-TP is to be based on the same architectural principles of layered networking that are used in longstanding transport network technologies like SDH, SONET and OTN. Service providers have already developed management processes and work procedures based on these principles.

MPLS-TP gives service providers a reliable packet-based technology that is based upon circuit-based transport networking, and thus is expected to align with current organizational processes and large-scale work procedures similar to other packet transport technologies.

MPLS-TP is a low cost L2.5 technology (if the limited profile to be specified is implemented in isolation) that provides QoS, end-to-end OA&M and protection switching.

In February 2008 the ITU-T and IETF agreed to work jointly on the design of MPLS-TP. Based on this agreement IETF and ITU-T experts will jointly work out the requirements and solutions. ITU-T in turn will update the existing T-MPLS standards based on the MPLS-TP related RFCs listed below.

== ITU-T ==
The following ITU-T Recommendations exist for MPLS-TP. Some of those Recommendations are superseding the ones that applied to T-MPLS before this work was ceased.

Recommendation	Title
G.8110.1	Architecture of the Multi-Protocol Label Switching transport profile layer network
G.8112	Interfaces for the MPLS transport profile layer network
G.8113.1	Operations, administration and maintenance mechanisms for MPLS-TP in packet transport networks
G.8113.2	Operations, administration and maintenance mechanisms for MPLS-TP networks using the tools defined for MPLS
G.8121	Characteristics of MPLS-TP equipment functional blocks
G.8121.1	Characteristics of MPLS-TP equipment functional blocks supporting ITU-T G.8113.1/Y.1372.1 OAM mechanisms
G.8121.2	Characteristics of MPLS-TP equipment functional blocks supporting ITU-T G.8113.2/Y.1372.2 OAM mechanisms
G.8131	Linear protection switching for MPLS transport profile
G.8151	Management aspects of the MPLS-TP network element
G.8152	Protocol-neutral management information model for the MPLS-TP network element

== RFC or drafts ==
The following IETF RFCs or drafts exist for MPLS-TP:

RFC	Title	Draft
RFC 5317	Joint Working Team (JWT) Report on MPLS Architectural Considerations for a Transport Profile	draft-bryant-mpls-tp-jwt-report
RFC 5586	MPLS Generic Associated Channel	draft-ietf-mpls-tp-gach-gal
RFC 5654	MPLS-TP Requirements	draft-ietf-mpls-tp-requirements
RFC 5718	An In-Band Data Communication Network For the MPLS Transport Profile	draft-ietf-mpls-tp-gach-dcn
RFC 5860	Requirements for Operations, Administration, and Maintenance (OAM) in MPLS Transport Networks	draft-ietf-mpls-tp-oam-requirements
RFC 5921	A Framework for MPLS in Transport Networks	draft-ietf-mpls-tp-framework
RFC 5950	Network Management Framework for MPLS-based Transport Networks	draft-ietf-mpls-tp-nm-framework
RFC 5951	Network Management Requirements for MPLS-based Transport Networks	draft-ietf-mpls-tp-nm-req
RFC 5960	MPLS Transport Profile Data Plane Architecture	draft-ietf-mpls-tp-data-plane
RFC 6215	MPLS Transport Profile User-to-Network and Network-to-Network Interfaces	draft-ietf-mpls-tp-uni-nni
RFC 6291	Guidelines for the Use of the "OAM" Acronym in the IETF	draft-ietf-opsawg-mpls-tp-oam-def
RFC 6370	MPLS-TP Identifiers	draft-ietf-mpls-tp-identifiers
RFC 6371	Operations, Administration, and Maintenance Framework for MPLS-Based Transport Networks	draft-ietf-mpls-tp-oam-framework
RFC 6372	MPLS Transport Profile (MPLS-TP) Survivability Framework	draft-ietf-mpls-tp-survive-fwk
RFC 6373	MPLS-TP Control Plane Framework	draft-ietf-ccamp-mpls-tp-cp-framework
RFC 6375	A Packet Loss and Delay Measurement Profile for MPLS-based Transport Networks	draft-ietf-mpls-tp-loss-delay-profile
RFC 6669	MPLS-TP OAM Analysis	draft-ietf-mpls-tp-oam-analysis
RFC 6426	MPLS On-demand Connectivity Verification and Route Tracing	draft-ietf-mpls-tp-on-demand-cv
RFC 6378	MPLS-TP Linear Protection	draft-ietf-mpls-tp-linear-protection
RFC 6427	MPLS Fault Management OAM	draft-ietf-mpls-tp-fault
RFC 6428	Proactive Connectivity Verification, Continuity Check and Remote Defect indication for MPLS Transport Profile	draft-ietf-mpls-tp-cc-cv-rdi
RFC 6478	Pseudowire Status for Static Pseudowires	draft-ietf-pwe3-static-pw-status
RFC 6435	MPLS Transport Profile lock Instruct and Loopback Functions	draft-ietf-mpls-tp-li-lb

== Solutions ==
The solutions for the above requirements and framework are as mentioned below and is under development:

- RFC 5718 An In-Band Data Communication Network For the MPLS Transport Profile
- RFC 5586 MPLS Generic Associated Channel- Defines GAL/G-ACH
- RFC 5462 "EXP field" renamed to "Traffic Class field"
- RFC 6435 MPLS Transport Profile Lock Instruct and Loopback Functions
- RFC 7087 A Thesaurus for the Interpretation of Terminology Used in MPLS Transport Profile (MPLS-TP) Internet-Drafts and RFCs in the Context of the ITU-T's Transport Network Recommendation
- MPLS-TP ACH TLV (IETF Draft)
- Proactive continuity and connectivity verification (Individual Draft)
- RFC 6291 Guidelines for the Use of the "OAM" Acronym in the IETF
- MPLS-TP OAM based on Y.1731 (Individual Draft)
- MPLS-TP Performance monitoring (Individual Draft)
- RFC 6427 MPLS Fault Management Operations, Administration, and Maintenance (OAM)
- RFC 6378 MPLS Transport Profile (MPLS-TP) Linear Protection
- RFC 7347 Pre-standard Linear Protection Switching in MPLS Transport Profile (MPLS-TP)
- MPLS-TP P2MP traffic protection (Individual Draft)
- MPLS-TP OAM Alarm suppression (Individual Draft)
- MPLS-TP & IP/MPLS Interworking (Individual Draft)
- MPLS-TP Ring Protection (Individual Draft)
- MPLS-TP LDP extension: No work
- MPLS-TP RSVP-TE extensions: No work
