= Provider router =

MPLS VPN network diagram with wikilinks

In Multiprotocol Label Switching (MPLS), a P router or provider router is a label switch router (LSR) that functions as a transit router of the core network. The P router is typically connected to one or more PE routers.

Here's one scenario: A customer who has facilities in LA and Atlanta wants to connect these sites over an MPLS VPN provided by AT&T. To do this, the customer would purchase a link from the on-site CE router to the PE router in AT&T's central office in LA and would also do the same thing in Atlanta. The PE routers would connect over AT&T's backbone routers (P routers) to enable the two CE routers in LA and Atlanta to communicate over the MPLS network.

== See also ==
- Customer edge router
- Provider edge router
