= Internet Protocol Options =

Optional parameters for Internet Protocol

There are a number of optional parameters that may be present in an Internet Protocol version 4 datagram. They typically configure a number of behaviors such as for the method to be used during source routing, some control and probing facilities and a number of experimental features.

== Available options ==
The possible options that can be put in the IPv4 header are as follows:

Field	Size (bits)	Description
Copied	1	Set to 1 if the options need to be copied into all fragments of a fragmented packet.
Option Class	2	A general options category. 0 is for control options, and 2 is for debugging and measurement. 1 and 3 are reserved.
Option Number	5	Specifies an option.
Option Length	8	Indicates the size of the entire option (including this field). This field may not exist for simple options.
Option Data	Variable	Option-specific data. This field may not exist for simple options.

The table below shows the defined options for IPv4. The Option Type column is derived from the Copied, Option Class, and Option Number bits as defined above.

Option Type (decimal/hexadecimal)	Option Name	Description
0/0x00	EOOL	End of Option List
1/0x01	NOP	No Operation
7/0x07	RR	Record Route
10/0x0A	ZSU	Experimental Measurement
11/0x0B	MTUP	MTU Probe
12/0x0C	MTUR	MTU Reply
15/0x0F	ENCODE	ENCODE
25/0x19	QS	Quick-Start
30/0x1E	EXP	RFC3692-style Experiment
68/0x44	TS	Time Stamp
82/0x52	TR	Traceroute
94/0x5E	EXP	RFC3692-style Experiment
130/0x82	SEC	Security (RIPSO)
131/0x83	LSR	Loose Source Route
133/0x85	E-SEC	Extended Security (RIPSO)
134/0x86	CIPSO	Commercial IP Security Option
136/0x88	SID	Stream ID
137/0x89	SSR	Strict Source Route
142/0x8E	VISA	Experimental Access Control
144/0x90	IMITD	IMI Traffic Descriptor
145/0x91	EIP	Extended Internet Protocol
147/0x93	ADDEXT	Address Extension
148/0x94	RTRALT	Router Alert
149/0x95	SDB	Selective Directed Broadcast
151/0x97	DPS	Dynamic Packet State
152/0x98	UMP	Upstream Multicast Packet
158/0x9E	EXP	RFC3692-style Experiment
205/0xCD	FINN	Experimental Flow Control
222/0xDE	EXP	RFC3692-style Experiment

== Loose source routing ==
Loose Source & Record Route (LSRR) is an IP option which can be used for address translation. LSRR is also used to implement mobility in IP networks.

Loose source routing uses a source routing option in IP to record the set of routers a packet must visit. The destination of the packet is replaced with the next router the packet must visit. By setting the forwarding agent (FA) to one of the routers that the packet must visit, LSR is equivalent to tunneling. If the corresponding node stores the LSR options and reverses it, it is equivalent to the functionality in mobile IPv6.

The name loose source routing comes from the fact that only part of the path is set in advance.

== Strict source routing ==
Strict Source and Record Route (SSRR) is in contrast with loose source routing, in which every step of the route is decided in advance where the packet is sent.

== Restrictions and considerations ==
The following two options are discouraged because they create security concerns: Loose Source and Record Route (LSRR) and Strict Source and Record Route (SSRR). Many routers block packets containing these options.

== See also ==
- Dynamic Source Routing
- Source routing
- Internet Protocol
