= Virtual leased line =

Ethernet-based communication over IP/MPLS networks

Virtual leased lines (VLL), also referred to as virtual private wire service (VPWS) or EoMPLS (Ethernet over MPLS), is a way to provide Ethernet-based point to point communication over Multiprotocol Label Switching (MPLS) or Internet Protocol networks. VLL uses the pseudo-wire encapsulation for transporting Ethernet traffic over an MPLS tunnel across an MPLS backbone.

== Types ==
There are 5 types of VLLs:

- Epipes: Emulates a point-to-point Ethernet service. VLAN-tagged Ethernet frames are supported. Interworking with other Layer 2 technologies is also supported.
- Apipes: Emulates a point-to-point ATM (Asynchronous Transfer Mode) service. Several subtypes are provided to support different ATM service types.
- Fpipes: Emulates point-to-point Frame Relay circuit. Some features for interworking with ATM are also supported.
- Ipipes: Provides IP interworking capabilities between different Layer 2 technologies.
- Cpipes: Emulates a point-to-point time-division multiplexing (TDM) circuit.

== See also ==
- Virtual Extensible LAN
- Virtual Private LAN Service
