= TSD Desalination =

Israeli solar startup company

- Trade name: Tethys Solar Desalination
- Type: Private
- Industry: Desalination, solar energy
- Founded: 2014; 12 years ago
- Founders: Joshua Altman; Ze'ev Emmerich; Moshe Tshuva
- Headquarters: Tel Aviv, Israel
- Key people: Gil Toren (CEO)
- Products: Solar-powered desalination and water treatment modules
- Website: www.tethysdesal.com

TSD Desalination (Tethys Solar Desalination) is an Israeli startup company that provides solar-powered desalination technology. Jewish Business News named TSD one of 25 cool Israeli startups to watch in 2017, and CNBC mentioned TSD alongside IDE Technologies in a review of Israeli high-tech.

Their technology, developed by Joshua Altman and Prof. Moshe Tshuva at Afeka College of Engineering in Tel Aviv, uses solar energy directly to power desalination and water treatment. Ze'ev Emmerich, a founder of TSD, claims their method is scalable and environmentally friendly, as well as being cheaper than reverse osmosis.

== History ==
TSD was established in 2014 with backing from angel investors. It has four founders; Tshuva has described setting up the company together with three partners, and the underlying technology is credited to Altman and Tshuva, who developed it at the Afeka College of Engineering in Tel Aviv, where Tshuva holds senior academic positions in mechanical and energy engineering. Gil Toren serves as chief executive.

In late 2016 the company said it intended to bring its first pilot installation into operation in Israel by the middle of the following year, and reported interest from parties in China, the United States and a number of African and Asian countries; it was then raising a Series A round. By March 2018 it had secured $500,000 in seed capital, had passed the prototype stage, was seeking $1.5 million in its Series A round and expected to start pilot projects in Israel and Jordan within six months. In mid-2018 a unit was undergoing trials at a kibbutz in northern Israel. By May 2019 the company had raised $600,000 through crowdfunding and was pursuing a further $2 million, with the aim of bringing to market a product that buyers in developing countries and drought-affected regions could purchase.

During the Cape Town water crisis of 2018 the founders put the technology forward as a possible response, proposing that units be sited on open ground outside the city, preferably near the coast, and their output pumped into municipal reservoirs. Altman has framed the company's wider aim as detaching water supply from state and municipal infrastructure and the capital investment such infrastructure requires. Tshuva has argued that the principal market lies not in countries such as Israel, which has both energy and capital, but in places with no water infrastructure at all; he has also pointed to California, where he says existing desalination capacity does not meet demand, and has suggested the units could serve as a backup supply and in natural disasters.

== Technology ==
The idea behind the company's process originated in the 1990s, when Altman, who was then teaching a university course on desalination, concluded that the available methods were both energy-hungry and damaging to the environment, and began looking for an alternative. When he first described the concept to Tshuva, who by then had spent some three decades in the solar energy industry, Tshuva doubted that the output would justify the effort, a judgement he later said had been mistaken. Rather than generate electricity from photovoltaic cells to drive a conventional plant, the two sought to apply solar energy to desalination directly, dispensing with electricity altogether.

The founders describe the resulting unit as a self-contained weather system: solar heat evaporates the feed water inside a sealed enclosure, leaving contaminants behind, and the vapour is condensed and drawn off as clean water. According to the company, the sequence is run four times within a single cycle in order to raise the yield, an arrangement Emmerich has likened to forming small clouds and harvesting water from them, and which he says allows each unit of incoming solar energy to be put to work more than once. The company states that the process can equally be driven by waste heat from industrial operations, which is ordinarily vented to the atmosphere.

Suitable feed water includes seawater, brackish groundwater, polluted water and domestic greywater such as water containing soap. A single module occupies roughly one square metre and is said to yield up to 50 litres of drinking water a day, enough for one household, with larger needs met by grouping modules together; on this basis the company has said that an installation can reach 10,000 cubic metres a day, a scale it presents as suited to farms, factories and hotels as well as to remote villages, desert resorts, beaches, sites without a grid connection and areas struck by disaster. The modules are built largely from recyclable materials, assembled close to where they will be used, and the size and layout of an array can be varied as required.

The company presents the method as requiring no pipeline network, no energy source other than sunlight, and leaving no adverse environmental mark, and estimates it reduces desalination energy costs by more than 90 per cent while also lowering construction, operating, and maintenance outlays. Emmerich has said the approach is scalable, environmentally sound and less expensive than reverse osmosis. ISRAEL21c has contrasted it with membrane-based reverse osmosis, which it describes as expensive to run and maintain, heavily dependent on electricity from fossil fuels, and best suited to very large plants occupying valuable coastal land, from which the treated water must then be carried long distances.
