= Point-to-Point Tunneling Protocol =

Computer network protocol

The Point-to-Point Tunneling Protocol (PPTP) is an obsolete method for implementing virtual private networks. PPTP has many well known security issues.

PPTP uses a TCP control channel and a Generic Routing Encapsulation tunnel to encapsulate PPP packets. Many modern VPNs use various forms of UDP for this same functionality.

The PPTP specification does not describe encryption or authentication features and relies on the Point-to-Point Protocol being tunneled to implement any and all security functionalities.

The PPTP implementation that ships with the Microsoft Windows product families implements various levels of authentication and encryption natively as standard features of the Windows PPTP stack. The intended use of this protocol is to provide security levels and remote access levels comparable with typical VPN products.

== History ==
A specification for PPTP was published in July 1999 as RFC 2637 and was developed by a vendor consortium formed by Microsoft, Ascend Communications (today part of Nokia), 3Com, and others.

PPTP has not been proposed nor ratified as a standard by the Internet Engineering Task Force.

== Description ==
A PPTP tunnel is instantiated by communication to the peer on TCP port 1723. This TCP connection is then used to initiate and manage a GRE tunnel to the same peer. The PPTP GRE packet format is non standard, including a new acknowledgement number field replacing the typical routing field in the GRE header. However, as in a normal GRE connection, those modified GRE packets are directly encapsulated into IP packets, and seen as IP protocol number 47. The GRE tunnel is used to carry encapsulated PPP packets, allowing the tunnelling of any protocols that can be carried within PPP, including IP, NetBEUI and IPX.

The RFC specification allows authentication using any PPP authentication method. In the Microsoft implementation, the tunneled PPP traffic can be authenticated with PAP, CHAP, MS-CHAP v1/v2, Extensible Authentication Protocol (EAP), or PEAP-MS-CHAP v2.

On Linux, the pptp program is only responsible for setting up the GRE layer. Any other process, including authentication, is the responsibility of pppd, the PPP handler. pppd can handle PAP, CHAP, MS-CHAP v1/v2, EAP (MD5-Challenge, SRP-SHA1, EAP-TLS, PEAP).

Regardless of the authentication method used, PPTP (or rather, its encapsulated PPP link) can only use Microsoft Point-to-Point Encryption, which is based on the broken RC4 with up to 128-bit key.

== Security ==
PPTP has been the subject of many security analyses and serious security vulnerabilities have been found in the protocol. The known vulnerabilities relate to the underlying PPP authentication protocols used, the design of the MPPE protocol as well as the integration between MPPE and PPP authentication for session key establishment.

=== Authentication layer ===
- MS-CHAP-v1 is fundamentally insecure. Tools exist to trivially extract the NT Password hashes from a captured MSCHAP-v1 exchange.
- When using MS-CHAP-v1, MPPE uses the same RC4 session key for encryption in both directions of the communication flow. This can be cryptanalysed with standard methods by XORing the streams from each direction together.
- MS-CHAP-v2 is vulnerable to dictionary attacks on the captured challenge response packets. Tools exist to perform this process rapidly.
- In 2012, it was demonstrated that the complexity of a brute-force attack on a MS-CHAP-v2 key is equivalent to a brute-force attack on a single DES key. An online service was also demonstrated which is capable of decrypting a MS-CHAP-v2 MD4 passphrase in 23 hours.

EAP-TLS are seen as the superior authentication choice for PPTP; however, it requires implementation of a public-key infrastructure (PKI) for both client and server certificates. As such, it may not be a viable authentication option for some remote access installations. The later PEAP also offers protection against capture of password hashes and response packets (making combinations such as PEAP-MS-CHAP secure), but also requires a PKI. Most networks that use PPTP have to apply additional security measures or be deemed completely inappropriate for the modern internet environment. At the same time, doing so means negating the aforementioned benefits of the protocol to some point.

=== Encryption layer ===
- MPPE uses the RC4 stream cipher for encryption. There is no method for authentication of the ciphertext stream and therefore the ciphertext is vulnerable to a bit-flipping attack. An attacker could modify the stream in transit and adjust single bits to change the output stream without possibility of detection. These bit flips may be detected by the protocols themselves through checksums or other means.

== See also ==
- IPsec
- Layer 2 Tunneling Protocol (L2TP)
- Secure Socket Tunneling Protocol (SSTP)
- OpenVPN, open source software application that implements VPN
- WireGuard, a simple and effective VPN implementation
