= Policy-based routing =

Technique in computer networking

In computer networking, policy-based routing (PBR) is a technique used to make routing decisions based on policies set by the network administrator.

When a router receives a packet, it normally decides where to forward it based on the destination address in the packet, which is then used to look up an entry in a routing table. However, in some cases, there may be a need to forward the packet based on other criteria. For example, a network administrator might want to forward a packet based on the source address, not the destination address. (Note: Source-specific routing, in which forwarding decisions by the network consider the source address, should not be confused with source routing, in which the sender of a packet specifies the path it takes through the network.) This permits routing of packets originating from different sources to different networks even when the destinations are the same and can be useful when interconnecting several private networks.

Policy-based routing may also be based on the size of the packet, the protocol of the payload, or other information available in a packet header or payload.

In the Cisco IOS, PBR is implemented using route maps. Linux supports multiple routing tables since version 2.2. FreeBSD supports PBR using either IPFW, IPFilter or OpenBSD's PF.

== Examples ==
PBR can be used to redirect traffic to a proxy server by using a PBR-aware L3-switch (router). In such a deployment, specific source traffic (e.g., HTTP, FTP) can be redirected to a cache engine. This is known as virtual inline deployment.
