= Egress router =

An egress router is a label switch router that is an end point (drain) for a given label-switched path (LSP). An egress router may be an ingress router or an intermediate router for any other LSP(s). Hence the role of egress and ingress routers is LSP specific. Usually, the MPLS label is attached with an IP packet at the ingress router and removed at the egress router, whereas label swapping is performed on the intermediate routers.
