= Generalized Multi-Protocol Label Switching =

Generalized Multi-Protocol Label Switching (GMPLS) is a protocol suite extending MPLS to manage further classes of interfaces and switching technologies other than packet interfaces and switching, such as time-division multiplexing, layer-2 switching, wavelength switching and fiber-switching.

== Differences between MPLS and GMPLS ==
Generalized MPLS differs from traditional MPLS in that it extends support to multiple types of switching such as TDM, wavelength and fiber (port) switching. For instance, GMPLS is the de facto control plane of wavelength switched optical network (WSON). The support for the additional types of switching has driven GMPLS to extend certain base functions of traditional MPLS and, in some cases, to add functionality.

These changes and additions impact basic label-switched path (LSP) properties: how labels are requested and communicated, the unidirectional nature of LSPs, how errors are propagated, and information provided for synchronizing the ingress and egress LSRs.

== How GMPLS works ==
GMPLS is based on Generalized Labels. The Generalized Label is a label that can represent either (a) a single fiber in a bundle, (b) a single waveband within fiber, (c) a single wavelength within a waveband (or fiber), or (d) a set of time-slots within a wavelength (or fiber). The Generalized Label can also carry a label that represents a generic MPLS label, a Frame Relay label, or an ATM label.

GMPLS is composed of three main protocols:

- Resource Reservation Protocol with Traffic Engineering extensions (RSVP-TE) signaling protocol.
- Open Shortest Path First with Traffic Engineering extensions (OSPF-TE) routing protocol.
- Link Management Protocol (LMP).

== See also ==
- Wavelength switched optical network (WSON)
- Automatic switched-transport network (ASTN)
