= Toshiba Telecommunication Systems Division =

Toshiba TSD
- Company type: Private
- Industry: Telecommunications
- Founded: 1975
- Fate: Dissolved March 21, 2017
- Headquarters: Irvine, California, USA
- Area served: USA and Latin America
- Key people: Brian Metherell, VP/GM
- Products: Business Telephone Systems ; VoIP Business Phone Systems, including Unified Communications, Call Center Solutions, Conferencing & Collaboration Solutions, Mobility Solutions, Voice Mail
- Parent: Toshiba America Information Systems (TAIS)
- Website: www.telecom.toshiba.com

Founded in 1975, Toshiba Telecommunication Systems Division (TSD) was a division of Toshiba America Information Systems Inc. (TAIS). This, in turn, is an independent operating company owned by Toshiba America Inc., a subsidiary of Toshiba Corporation.

Headquartered in Irvine, California, TSD is a manufacturer of IP business telephone systems, designed for small to medium-sized businesses and larger enterprises with multiple locations. Its 'Strata CIX IP' business telephone systems and related applications are sold by a network of Authorized Toshiba Dealers throughout the United States and Latin America.

== Products ==
Some of Toshiba Telecommunications Systems Division's (TSD's) products include:

- IPedge Pure IP Business Telephone System
- VIPedge Cloud-based Business Telephone Solution
- Strata CIX IP Business Telephone Systems
- Unified Communications
- Conferencing and Collaboration Solutions
- Call Center Solutions
- IP Business Telephones
- Digital Business Telephones
- Business Mobility Solutions
- SIP Trunking
- Voice Mail Systems
