= Flitter =

Flitter may refer to:

- Flitter, character in My Little Pony
- A number of butterflies:
  - Golden tree flitter Quedara basiflava
  - Tree flitter Hyarotis adrastus
  - Brush flitter Hyarotis microstrictum
  - Dubious flitter Quedara monteithi of genus Quedara

== See also ==
- Flit (disambiguation)
- Flit gun, an insecticide sprayer
- Flittermouse, the bat
- Flitter Milz, a U.S. law firm
