= Flit =

Flit or FLIT may refer to:

- FliT (band), a Ukrainian-American punk rock band
- Flit (computer networking), a link-level atomic piece that forms a network packet or stream
- Flit (horse) (foaled 2016), an Australian thoroughbred racehorse
- Flit (insecticide), a brand of insecticide
- River Flit, in Bedfordshire, England
- Flit, a character in the 1966 film Il vostro super agente Flit
- Flit, a hummingbird in the 1995 film Pocahontas
- FLIT, a symbolic debugger which was the precursor of the "Dynamic Debugging Technique", DDT

== See also ==
- Flit gun
- Flitter (disambiguation)
