= Walking in Circles =

Walking in Circles may refer to:

- Walking in Circles, a track from the 2009 album Out of Ashes
- Walking in Circles (web series), an American comedy web series
- Walking in Circles (album), a 2017 album by FliT
