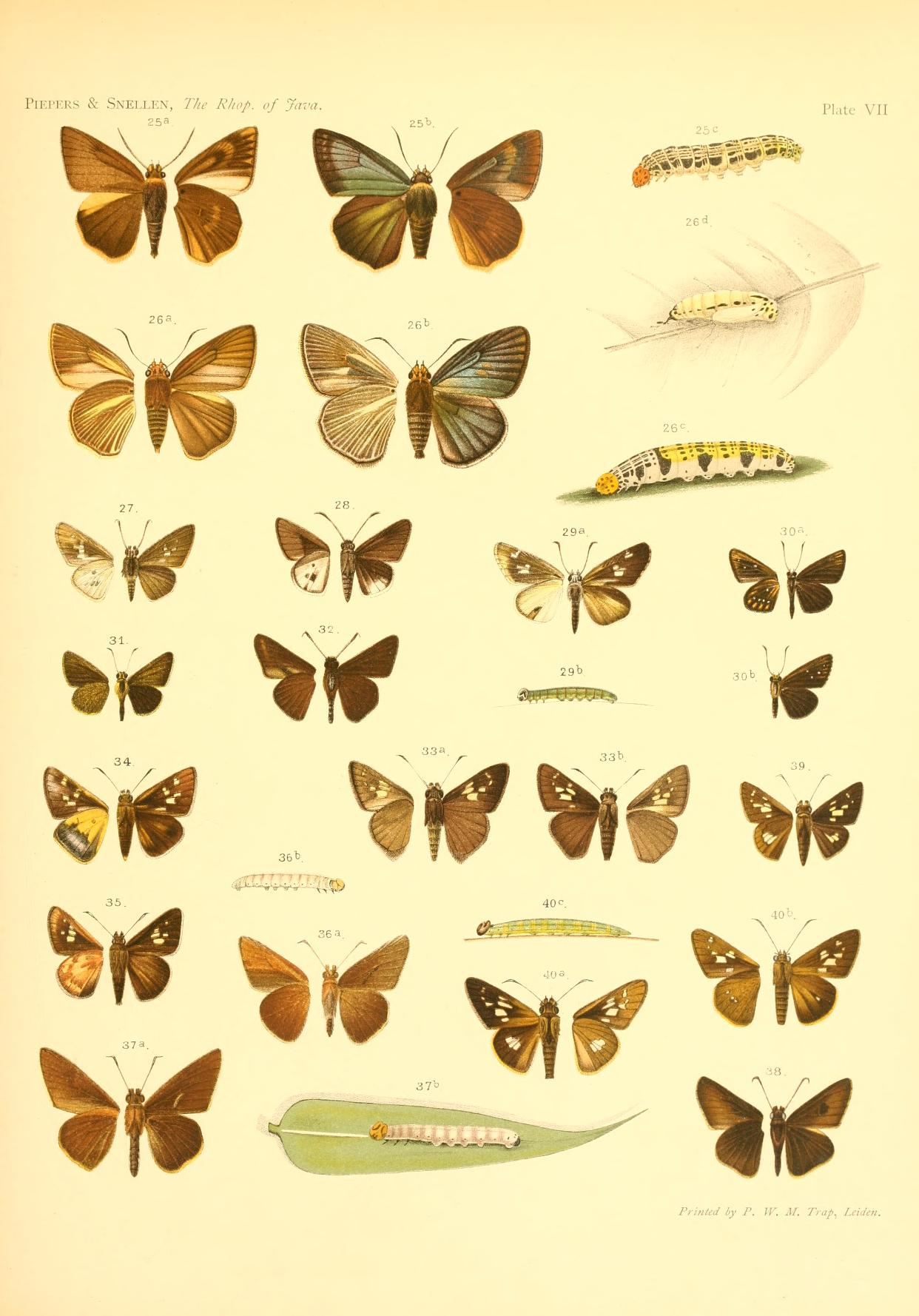
- Hyarotis iadera (figure 32)

Scientific classification
- Kingdom: Animalia
- Phylum: Arthropoda
- Class: Insecta
- Order: Lepidoptera
- Family: Hesperiidae
- Tribe: Erionotini
- Genus: Hyarotis; Moore, 1881

= Hyarotis =

Genus of butterflies

Hyarotis is a genus of grass skippers in the family Hesperiidae.It is found in the Indomalayan realm

== Species ==
- Hyarotis adrastus (Cramer, 1780) - tree flitter
- Hyarotis microstrictum (Wood-Mason & de Nicéville, 1887) - brush flitter
- Hyarotis stubbsi Eliot, 1959 Malaya
- Hyarotis iadera (de Nicéville, 1895) Thailand, Malaya, Borneo, Sumatra, Siberut, Banka, Java, Bali.

== Biology ==
The larvae feed on Palmae including Calamus, Calamus, Chrysalidocarpus, Phoenix
