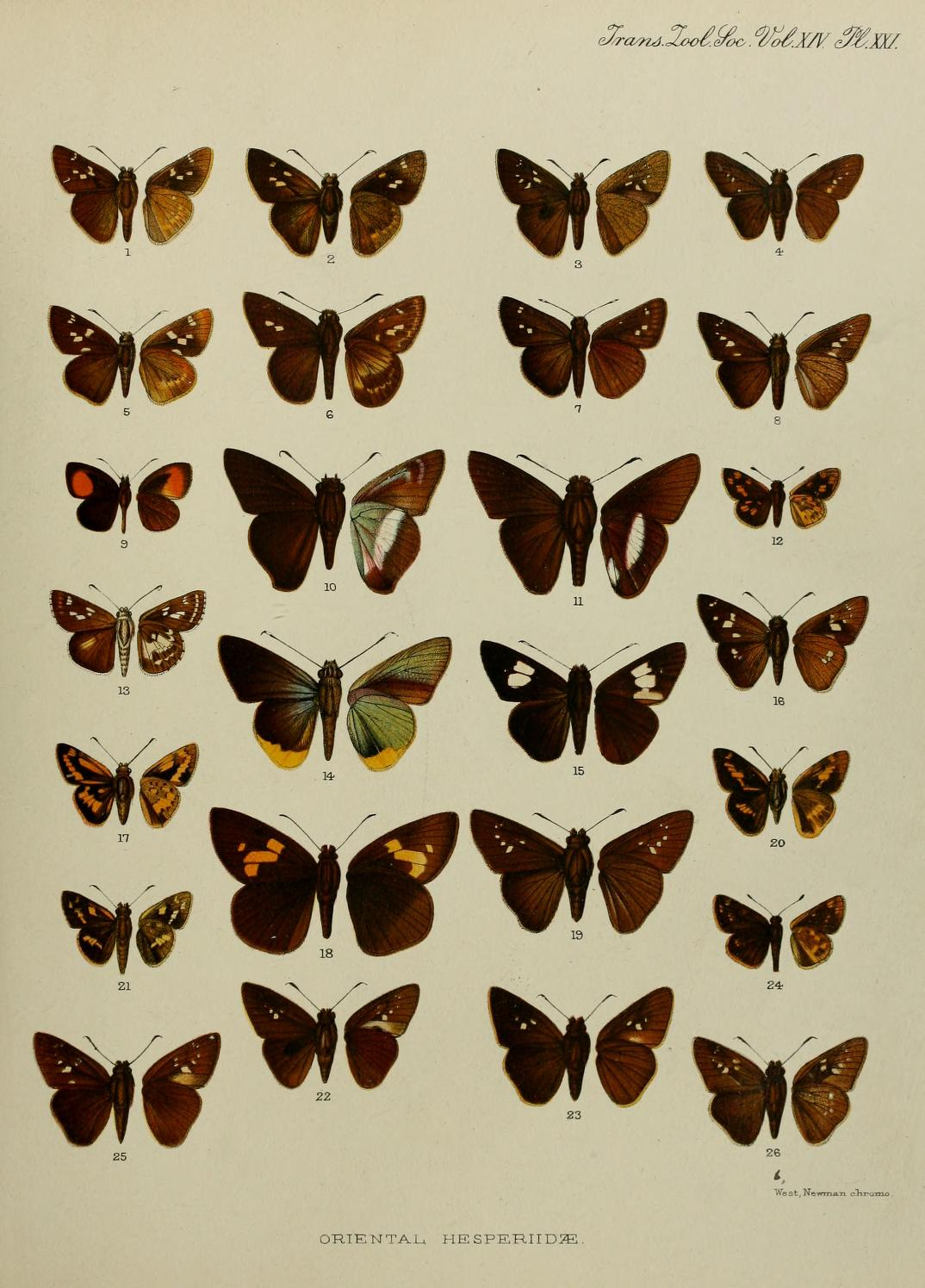
- Quedara inornata (figure 15)

Scientific classification
- Kingdom: Animalia
- Phylum: Arthropoda
- Class: Insecta
- Order: Lepidoptera
- Family: Hesperiidae
- Tribe: Erionotini
- Genus: Quedara; C. Swinhoe, 1919

= Quedara =

Genus of butterflies

Quedara is a genus of grass skipper butterflies in the family Hesperiidae. The genus was established by Charles Swinhoe in 1919.

== Species ==
Listed alphabetically:

- Quedara albifascia (Moore, 1878) – Myanmar, Laos
- Quedara basiflava (de Nicéville, [1889]) – endemic to Western Ghats, India
- Quedara flavens Devyatkin, 2000 – northern Vietnam, southern Yunnan
- Quedara inornata (Elwes & Edwards, 1897) – Borneo
- Quedara monteithi (Wood-Mason & de Nicéville, [1887]) – dubious flitter – Malaya
- Quedara singularis (Mabille, 1893)

== Biology ==
The larvae feed on Palmae including Calamus and Eugeissona,
