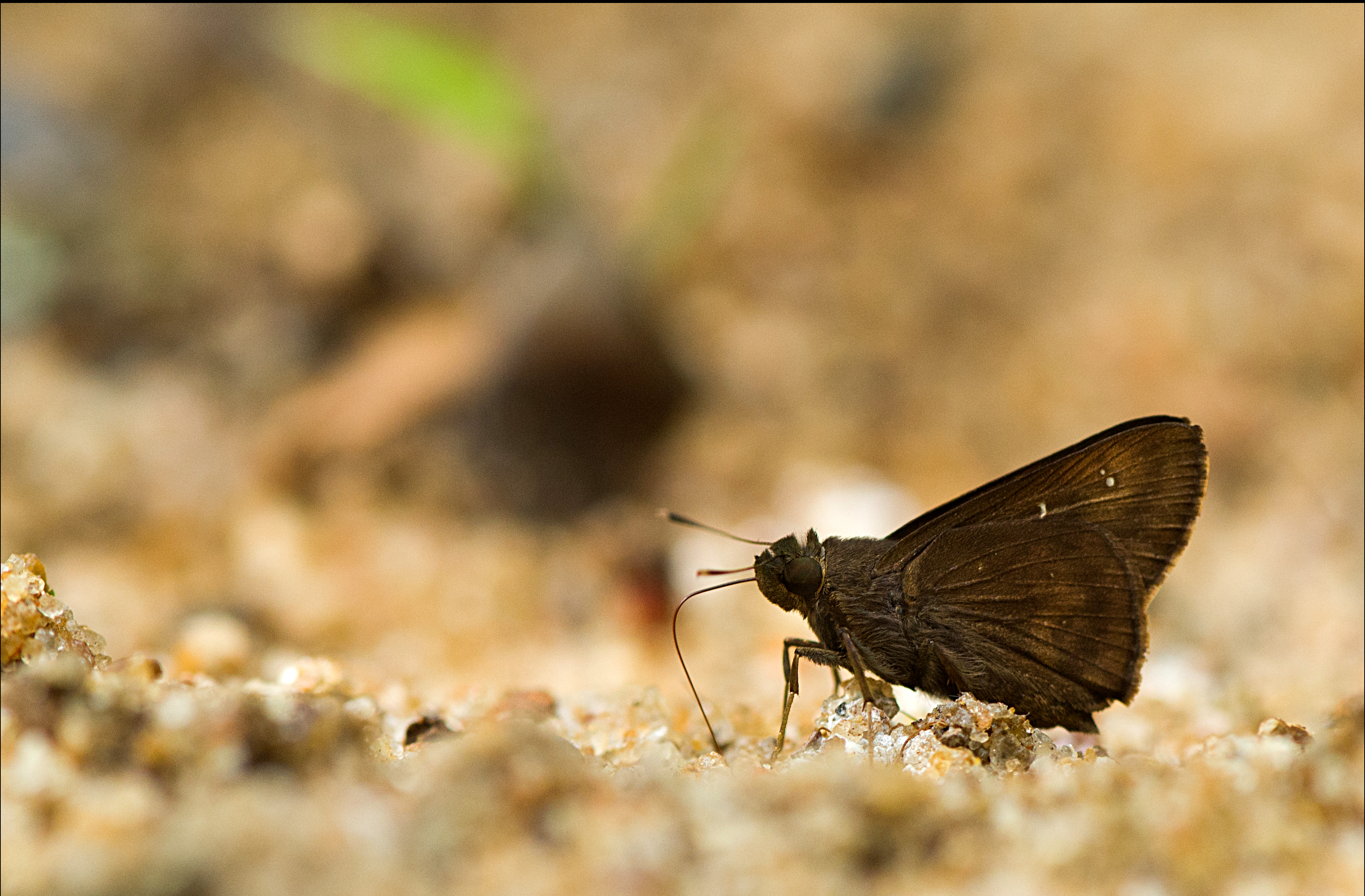

Scientific classification
- Kingdom: Animalia
- Phylum: Arthropoda
- Clade: Pancrustacea
- Class: Insecta
- Order: Lepidoptera
- Family: Hesperiidae
- Genus: Hyarotis
- Species: H. microstictum

Binomial name
- Hyarotis microstictum (Wood-Mason & de Nicéville, 1887)

= Hyarotis microstictum =

Brush flitter

Species of butterfly

Hyarotis microstictum, the brush flitter, is a butterfly belonging to the family Hesperiidae. It is found in the Indomalayan realm (Assam to Myanmar, Thailand, Langkawi, Malaya, Borneo, Sumatra, Philippines) and in South India. H. m. coorga Evans, 1949 is the subspecies found in South India. H. m. microstictum (Wood-Mason & de Nicéville, [1887]) is the subspecies found in the Indomalayan realm.

== Description ==
Male. Upperside, both wings dark vandyke-brown, suffused with purple especially on the costal and outer margins and the veins; the cilia ochreous-grey. Forewing with five small semi-transparent white lustrous spots, two (the first of which is very minute) before the apex, and three discal, one geminated in the cell consisting of an anterior outwardly convex thin crescentic and a posterior triangular portion, another about the same size behind and a little external to this between the first and second median nervules sub-crescentic in shape, with its convexity turned towards the base, and a third squarish external to and in front of, and rather less than half the size of, this again between the second and turned median nervules. Underside. Forewing lighter than above, the translucent spots as on the upperside; with an indistinct sub-marginal band of spots darker than the ground; a dark anteciliary line; the cilia obsoletely intersected at the veins with dark; and an indistinct whitey-brown spot touching the first median nervule and the satiny patch extending from the base nearly to the outer angle and from the interno-median fold to the inner margin of the wing, which bears a conspicuous fringe of slate-grey setae in part projecting straight backwards and outwards from the edge and in part turned up so as to lie spread out fan-wise over the satiny-ashy patch. Hindwing darker and more suffused with purple than the forewing, with a dark anteciliary line, but even less distinctly intersected cilia; with some dark mottling indistinctly arranged in three bands, one sub-basal and two closer together, discal or sub-marginal, and with an indistinct dot between the costal and sub-costal nervures, another near the end of the cell, on one side only in one specimen, and on both sides in the other, a third between the second and third median nervules in one specimen, and a fourth between the first and second in the other, all ochreous-white. Female. Upperside, both wings much lighter than in the male. Forewing with the spots much larger and more numerous, there being an additional sub-apical one, a very minute dot just in front of the third median nervule, both semi-transparent, and a third opaque yellow one (present in one male) touching the sub-median nervure in front, and the third discal spot being quadrate with the inner and outer ends roundly emarginate. Underside, both wings with the dark markings more distinct than in the male. Forewing devoid of the ashy patch and fringe of setae seen in the opposite sex. Hindwing with two dots behind the costal nervure instead of one, one in the cell, and another between the second and third median nervules on one side only so minute as to be scarcely discernible.

— Charles Swinhoe, Lepidoptera Indica. Vol. X
