= FliT =

Ukrainian-American punk rock band

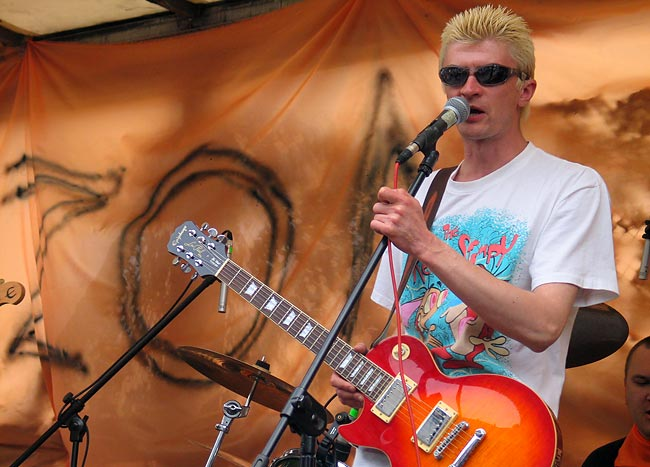

Background information
- Also known as: Flit (Фліт) (2001–2018)
- Origin: Ivano-Frankivsk, Ukraine; Cincinnati, United States
- Genres: punk rock, folk punk, rock, alternative rock
- Years active: 2001 - present
- Labels: UkrMusic, Moon Records, FDRmedia
- Members: Volodymyr Novikov; Igor Ozarko; Andriy Dragushchak; Vitalii Bieliakov
- Past members: Andriy Markiv; Charles "Nova Chuck" Baker; Steve Larsen; Kevin Mccullum; Vladislav Martsinkovsky; Roman Boyko; Oleksandr Ivanchuk; Anatoliy Blyednyh; Volodymyr Korchak; Stanislav Bondarchuk; Yuliy Honskyy; Mykhaylo Kopievskyi; Yuriy Popov; Yuriy Chornyi
- Website: https://facebook.com/FliT.5k/

FliT is a Ukrainian–American punk rock band that was formed in 2001 in Ivano-Frankivsk. Influenced by SoCal punk, FliT crafted their own brand of music and cultivated a massive following, releasing three albums, touring Europe and playing multiple festivals. They themselves call their musical direction as "intelligent punk rock".

Founding members Volodymyr (guitar, vocals and songwriter) and Igor (drummer, manager) moved to the United States to pursue other careers but never lost their vision to recreate the musical and creative successes of FliT. In 2017, the two officially reformed the group releasing the U.S. debut project, Walking in Circles, an English version of previous FliT hits.

== History ==
=== Early years and album "Svit takyi" ("The world is such…") (2001–2004) ===
The band was formed in Ivano-Frankivsk, Ukraine in 2001, when five young people united under short but precise name “FliT”. Members of the first FliT was: Volodymyr Novikov — lead vocal Vitalii Bieliakov — backing vocals, Andriy Markiv – guitar, Mykhaylo Kopievskyy – bass, Yuriy Chornyi – drums.

Two years later in 2003, Yuriy Chornyi left the band because of creative odds. He was replaced by Igor Ozarko, who also became a band manager.

On December 17, 2003, the band introduced the first album "Svit takyi…" ("The world is such…"), which included 15 tracks.

In the beginning of 2004, backing vocalist and co-creator of lyrics Vitalii Bieliakov left the band.

In October 2004, «UKRmusic» records re-released album "Svit takyi…" ("The world is such…").

One of its songs, "Yizhachok" ("Hedgehog") became the most popular track of the band. Due to its success, hedgehog become part of band's logo.

=== Album "Zanykay" ("Hide It") and VIDEO DVD Live (2005-2008) ===
In 2005, the band actively performed both in Ukraine and abroad.

On April 2, 2006, the new album "Zanykay" ("Hide It"), which included 13 songs was released in Kyiv, Ukraine.

On June 16, 2007, the band had its first large recital, which was filmed. The video of this performance in Ivano-Frankivsk was released on DVD in September. In addition to the concert recording, it included collection of band clips, chosen pictures of the band and interviews with band-members.

=== Album "Odnoznachno" ("Definitely") 2009 ===
Officially released on April 23, 2009, new album included 12 tracks. Video of two songs from this album were directed by Taras Khimich.

The band participated in the folk music project at the First National TV channel. The purpose of this project was the search and revival of Ukrainian folk songs, their promotion, especially among the youth. During the program, FliT performed the folk song "Chumak Pye" ("Drinking Chumak") in their own interpretation, which, according to the audience voting, became the "song of the month". It also became a part of the new album "Odnoznachno" ("Definitely").

Unlike previous albums, this album was recorded in Kyiv instead of Ivano-Frankivsk. Here is what Mikhail Kopyevsky said in this regard:

"We are completely satisfied with the quality of the recording of our previous work. However, when we recorded the song "Laiu Sebe" ("І scold myself") at the FDR studio, we realized that we would record the next album there. We like the quality of recording and sound, although there is no limit to perfection."

The key advantage of the album "Odnoznachno" ("Definitely") according to its creators is content with deep meaning.

=== VIDEO DVD "Unplugged concert" Live (2010) ===
At the beginning of 2010, Igor Ozarko came up with the idea of performing a number of FliT songs, arranged in different musical styles in an acoustic performance. As a result, the band prepared an acoustic concert program, which they performed in different cities of Ukraine.

On June 15, 2010, FliT together with the Quarto Corde String Ensemble, the Vertical Limit band, and other invited musicians performed the first largest in Ukrainian history acoustic concert in Ivano-Frankivsk. Instrumental parts for the ensemble were written by Miroslav Litvak. The concert was also filmed.

The band won a cover song contest from the Russian punk rock band "Tarakany!" (Тараканы!) With the song "Ya Dyvlius Na Nykh" ("I look at them").

=== Changes in members (2011–2013) ===
In November 2010, the drummer and manager Igor Ozarko left the band due to his move to the U.S. As his replacement, he offered young talented drummer Vladimir Korchak.

In March 2011, the band released a new video for the single "Kokhai Mene" ("Love Me") a video was recorded with Kuzma Skryabin (Andriy Kuzmenko).

In July 2011, vocalist Vladimir Novikov also left the band due to the move to the U.S. Yuri Popov started to sing. The same month, the new band released a video for the new song "Zamaniuiut ochi" ("Lure of Your Eyes"), which was written by Vladimir Novikov on the eve of the relocation.

Yuriy Popov also left the band soon after.

On October 4, 2011, Flit presented a new song and video "Anhely posered nas" ("Angels among us"), which was performed by Andrey Markiv as the lead singer of band.

In December 2011, the group announced the further changes in membership. The bass player Mykhaylo Kopievskyy switched from performing to video production. As his replacement he offered musician Anatoliy Blednyh, while for the vacant position of guitarist and backing vocalist Flit invited Juliy Gonski.

In 2012, the band recorded several new songs, presented a video for the song "Vykhid Ye!" ("Exit Exists!"), conducted recitals in Ukraine and Poland, and participated in music festivals.

=== Album "Vykhid Ye!" ("Exit Exists!") (2013–2017) ===
On May 1, 2013, the Ukrainian band Flit released their new fourth album called "Vykhid Ye!" ("Exit Exists!").

This album was very different from previous ones. First of all, during the work on the album guitarist and backing vocalist Julius Gonski left the band due to conflicting views on creative process. He was replaced by the band's old friend guitarist Stanislav Bodnaruk, known for his work in another Ivano-Frankivsk band, Pan Pupec' (Пан Пупец). Another change is the approach to songwriting. Although before all songs where created by band members, this time only music was created by band, while lyrics was ordered from outside.

From May 10, 2013, Flit started a tour with his album "Vykhid Ye!" ("Exit Exists!").

During 2014–2017, Ukrainian Flit released seven singles: "Ukraina" ("Ukraine"), "NonStop", "Koly mene znaidut" ("When They Find Me"), Ostannii Heroi ("The Last Hero"), "Vse Navpaky" ("All the Way"), "Doroha" ("The Road"), "Ty ne sam" ("You're not alone").

=== Novikov and Ozarko came back to FliT, Re-release Walking in Circles (2017–2018) ===
Early in the year 2017, Vladimir Novikov and Igor Ozarko reunited again. Regardless large difference between the states they live in U.S., they found time and inspiration to launch new project in the U.S. In 2017-2018 they were selecting full-time musicians for the band. During this time they named the band "5kMiles" (approximate distance between U.S. and Ukraine).

At the beginning of 2018, Vova and Igor re-released album of Ukrainian Flit songs in English language called "Walking in Circles" to begin concert activity in the U.S. and observe the reaction of local rock fans to music from Ukraine. A little later, they introduced a new single "New York Symphony".

=== New page in FliT story. EPs "Raptom" ("Suddenly") and "Just Go" (2019–present) ===
In 2019 FliT started a new page in band story.

1. Vladimir Novikov and Igor Ozarko started performing under the old name FliT (but now using Latin instead of Cyrillic).
2. Andriy Markiv, who has been a member of the Flit in Ukraine since its creation, announces his leave.
3. After 15-year break, one of the founders of the Flit, co-author of the lyrics of the album "Svit takyi…" ("The World is such..."), backing vocalist Vitalii Bieliakov (Bielia) returns to the band.
4. In the spring, FliT accidentally got in touch a young talented musician, Andriy Dragushchak, who became bass player.

On July 1, 2019, the rebranded Ukrainian-American FliT releases the new EP "Raptom" ("Suddenly") in Ukrainian, atmospherically designed in the style of the first FliT album "Svit takyi…" ("The World is such..."). After an eight-year break, the vocals of Volodymyr Novikov returned on this new folk-punk EP.

It is symbolic that after the retrieval into the professional music and despite ten years of American residency the new album was created in Ukrainian. The EP "Raptom" ("Suddenly") includes six songs that boost optimist and energy. The cover of EP "Raptom" ("Suddenly") depicts the punk Cossack BILLY - a new mascot of the collective.

December 17, 2019, FliT released new EP - "Just Go".

== Band members ==
Current members

- Volodymyr Novikov — guitar, vocals (2001–2011, since 2018)
- Ihor Ozarko — drums (2003—2010, since 2018)
- Andrіy Dragushchak — bass guitar, backing vocals (since 2019)
- Vitalii "Bielia" Bieliakov — backing vocals (2001–2004, since 2018)

Past Members

- Andriy Markiv – guitar (2001-2018), vocals (2011-2018)
- Charles "Nova Chuck" Baker — bass guitar, backing vocals (2018—2019)
- Vladyslav Martsynkovskyi — bass guitar, backing vocals (2018)
- Roman Boyko — bass guitar, backing vocals (2017—2018)
- Oleksandr Ivanchuk — guitar, backing vocals (2015—2018)
- Anatoliy Blyednyh – bass guitar (2011—2018)
- Volodymyr Korchak – drums (2011—2018)
- Stanislav Bondarchuk – guitar, backing vocals (2013—2015)
- Yuliy Honskyy – guitar (2011—2013)
- Mykhaylo Kopievskiy – bass guitar, backing vocals (2001—2012)
- Yuriy Popov – guitar, vocals (2011)
- Yuriy Chornyi – drums, founder of the group (2001—2003)

Former touring musicians

- Steve Larsen
- Kevin Mccullum

Timeline

== Discography ==
=== Studio albums ===
- 2004 - Svit takyi… (Ukrainian: Світ такий…; Translation: The world is such…)
- 2006 - Zanykay (Ukrainian: Zаникай; Translation: Hide it)
- 2009 - Odnoznachno (Ukrainian: Однозначно; Translation: Definitely)
- 2013 - Vykhid Ye! (Ukrainian: Вихід є!; Translation: Solution exists! [Literally: Way out exists!])
- 2018 - Walking in Circles (re-release)

=== Extended plays ===
Raptom

EP by FliT
- Released: July 1, 2019
- Studio: FDRmedia
- Genres: rock; alternative rock; punk rock; folk punk
- Length: 16:45
- Label: Not On Label (Self-released)

- 2019 - Raptom (Ukrainian: Раптом; Translation: Suddenly): the first mini-album of FliT. Released on July 1, 2019, the album consists of six songs. The cover of EP "Raptom" ("Suddenly") depicts the punk Cossack BILLY - a new mascot of the collective. This is the first new album since the return of Vladimir Novikov and Igor Ozarko. A music video was recorded on the songs "Volotsiuha" ("Tramp") and "Maiemo te, shcho maiemo" ("We have what we have"). As part of the tour to support the new album in the summer of 2019, the band has performed at several major festivals in Ukraine (Faine Misto, Bandershtat, Skhid-Rok, Snow Summer Fest), played two solo concerts in Kyiv and Kharkiv and performed at the Ukrainian Days festival in the US. Also, one of the founders of the band Vitaliy "Belya" Belyakov participated in the tour.
- 2019 - Just Go

==== Track listing for Raptom ====
No.	Title	Length
1.	"Maiemo te, shcho maiemo (Ukrainian: Маємо те, що маємо; Translation: We have what we have)"	03:12
2.	"Volotsiuha (Ukrainian: Волоцюга; Translation: Tramp)"	02:45
3.	"Koza-Dereza (Ukrainian: Коза-Дереза; Translation: Goat Dereza)"	00:14
4.	"Hukai myla, hukai (Ukrainian: Гукай мила, гукай; Translation: New Day)"	02:21
5.	"Smuhy (Ukrainian: Смуги; Translation: Stripes)"	03:51
6.	"Povertaisia (Ukrainian: Повертайся; Translation: Come back)"	04:22

==== Personnel for Raptom ====
- Volodymyr Novikov — guitar, vocals
- Igor Ozarko — drums, backing vocals
- Andrіy Dragushchak — bass guitar, backing vocals
- Vitalii Bieliakov — backing vocals

=== Live albums ===
- 2007 VIDEO DVD Live (Concert in Ivano-Frankivsk) (Ukrainian: Концерт в Івано-Франківську)
- 2010 VIDEO DVD "Unplugged concert" Live (Acoustic concert)

=== Singles ===
- 2008 - Layu sebe (Ukrainian: Лаю себе; Translation: Abusing Myself)
- 2010 - Shukay i znaydy (Ukrainian: Шукай і знайди; Translation: Search and find)
- 2016 - Vse navpaky (Ukrainian: Все навпаки; Translation: All the other way around)
- 2018 - New York Symphony
- 2019 - Smugi (Ukrainian: Смуги; Translation: Stripes)
- 2020 - Club 27
- 2020 - ZaBoBoNy (Ukrainian: ЗаБоБоНи; Translation: Superstitions)
