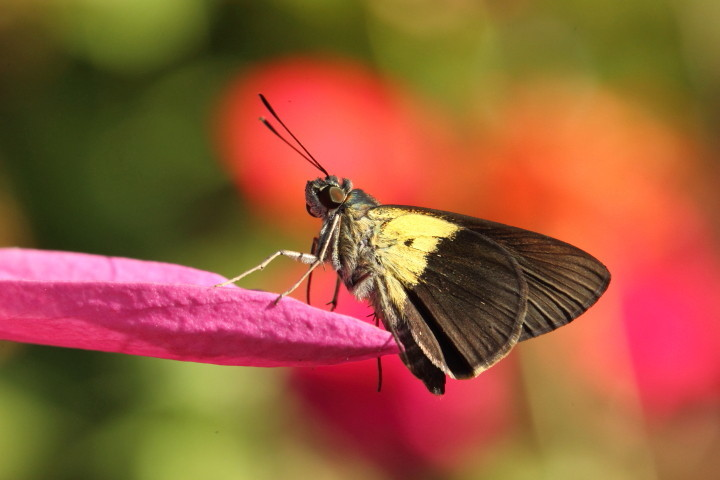

Scientific classification
- Kingdom: Animalia
- Phylum: Arthropoda
- Class: Insecta
- Order: Lepidoptera
- Family: Hesperiidae
- Genus: Quedara
- Species: Q. basiflava

Binomial name
- Quedara basiflava (de Nicéville, 1888)

= Quedara basiflava =

Golden flitter

Species of butterfly

Quedara basiflava, the yellow-base flitter or golden flitter, is a butterfly belonging to the family Hesperiidae and is endemic to India's Western Ghats.

== Description ==
Male. Upperside dark glossy blackish-brown, almost black. Forewing with a short post-medial semi-hyaline, white, fairly broad band, composed of two semi-quadrate, rather long, conjugated spots, filling up the end of the cell, the lower spot the larger, a still larger semi-quadrate spot below extending to the first median nervule, only divided from the upper spots by the median vein, its outer end extending somewhat outwards. Hindwing without markings. Cilia of both wings brown. Underside almost as dark as the upperside. Forewing with markings similar. Hindwing with a chrome-yellow basal patch, varying in extent in different examples, in the type specimen the basal third of the wing is so coloured, in some examples from the Nilgiris the chrome-yellow basal patch is much more limited. Antennae black, without markings; palpi, head and body above and the legs concolorous with the wings, palpi and thorax below greyish, abdomen cinereous. Female like the male, the spots on the forewing a little larger.

— Charles Swinhoe, Lepidoptera Indica. Vol. X

== Food plants ==
The larvae feed on Calamus hookerianus, Calamus pseudofeanus, Calamus rotang and Calamus thwaitesii.
