= Flit (insecticide) =

Liquid spray insecticide (1923-c.1960)

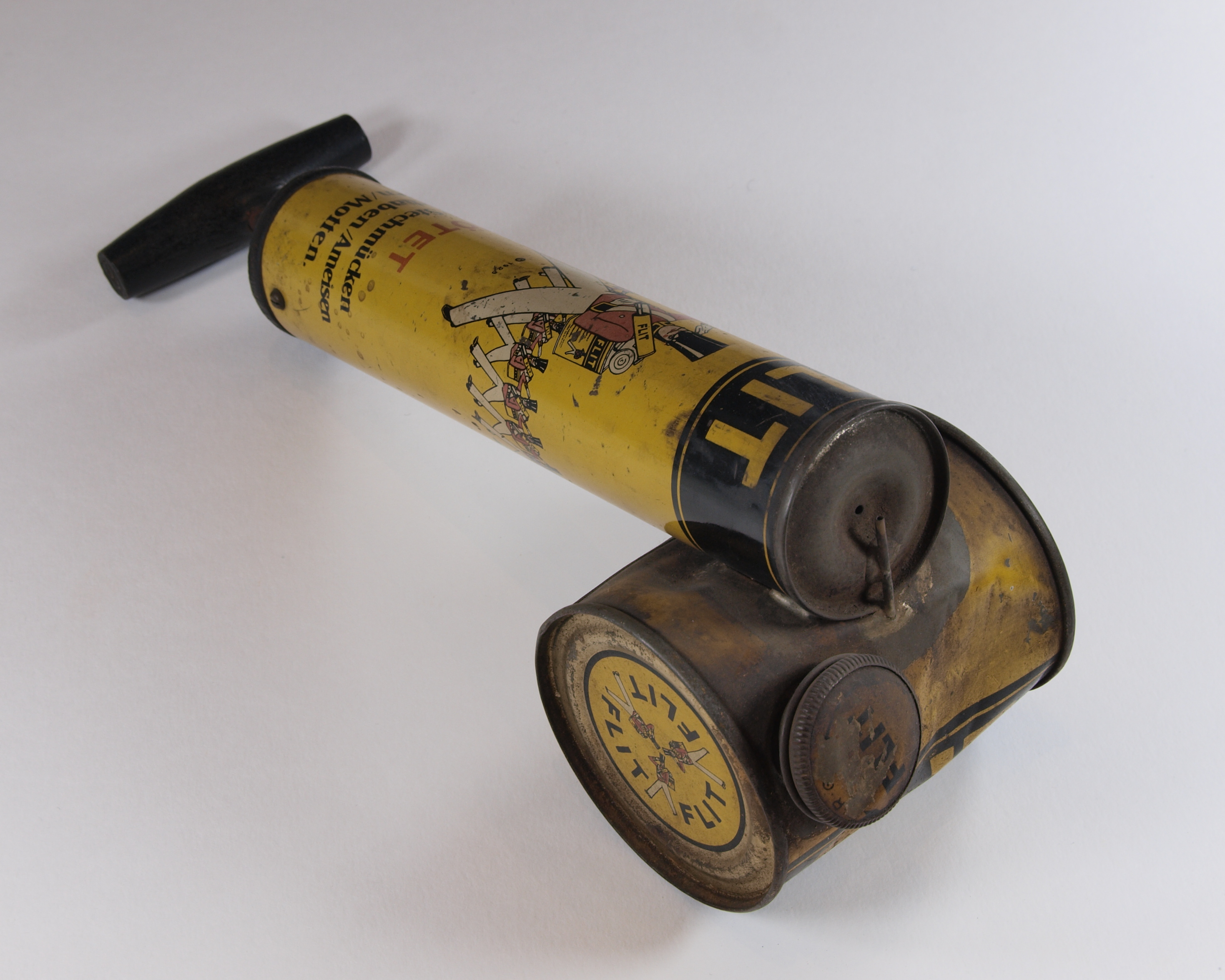
Flit manual spray pump for insecticides from 1928

Flit (stylized in all caps) was the brand name for an insecticide. The original product, invented by chemist Dr. Franklin C. Nelson and launched in 1923 and mainly intended for killing flies and mosquitoes, was mineral oil based and manufactured by the Standard Oil Company of New Jersey, before the company, now part of ExxonMobil, was renamed first Esso and later Exxon. A hand-operated atomizer called a Flit gun was commonly used to perform the spraying.

After DDT proved successful as an insecticide used by the U.S. military in World War II, Flit was reformulated to contain 1 to 5 percent DDT in 1947. An alternative formula containing lindane was introduced in 1950. Once the negative environmental impact of both these substances became widely known, Esso replaced these formulations in 1967 with a mineral oil-based product called Flit Mosquito Larvacidal Oil (marketed as Flit MLO). The brand was later discontinued, and Exxon allowed the Flit trademark to expire in 1996.

The Flit brand name has been reused for another insecticide product, with the primary active ingredient of permethrin, marketed by Clarke Mosquito Control. The current product is most often used to control adult mosquitoes. Spraying it into the air kills adult mosquitoes that are present and then by settling onto surfaces it kills mosquitoes that may later land.

== "Quick, Henry, the Flit!" ==
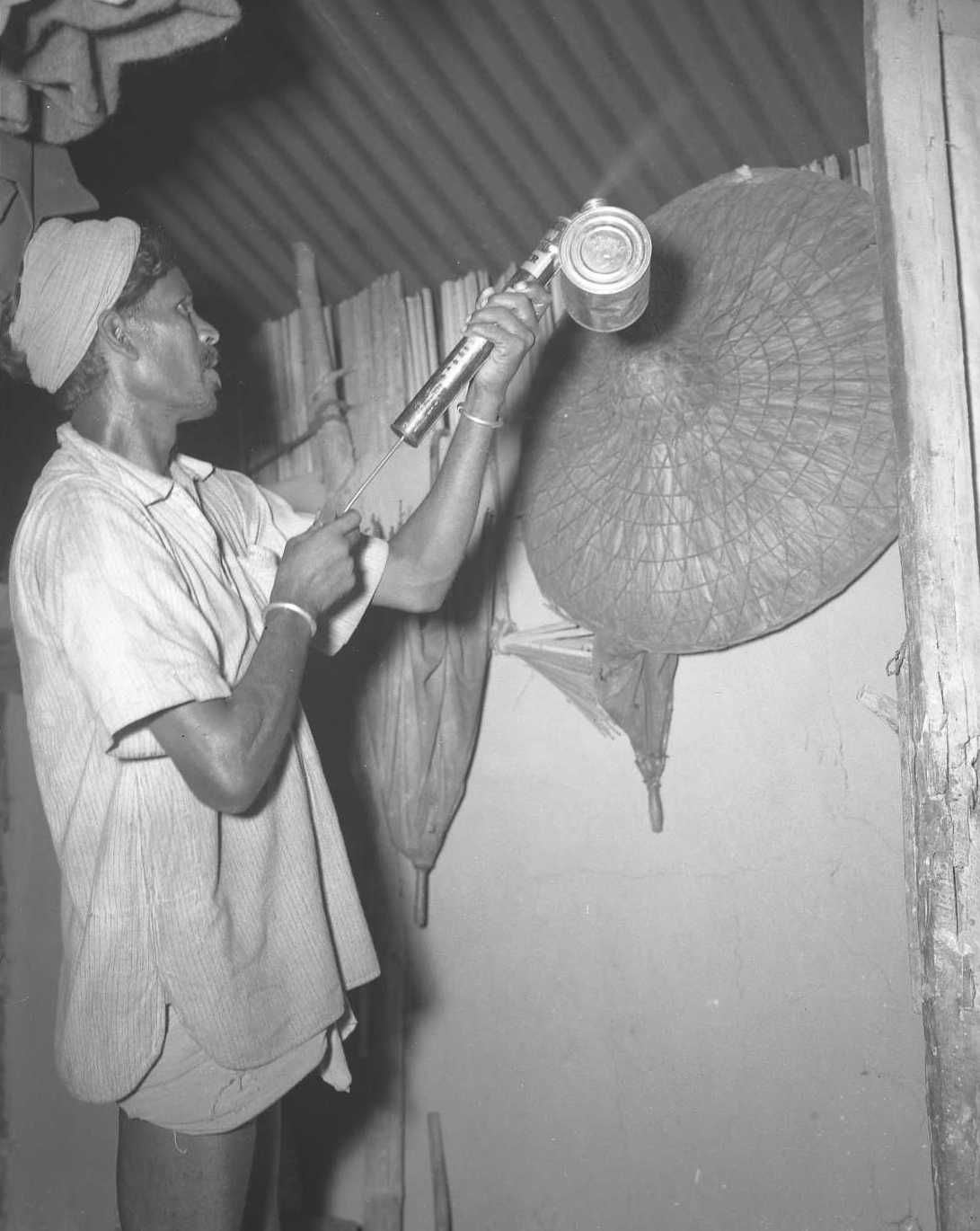
World War II "Flitting" or spraying insecticide

In 1923, Flit, then marketed by a newly formed subsidiary of Jersey Standard, Stanco Incorporated, became the subject of a very successful long-running advertising campaign. From 1928 to 1941, the artwork for this campaign was created by Theodor Seuss Geisel, years before he started writing the children's books that made him famous as Dr. Seuss. The ads typically showed people menaced by whimsical insect-like creatures.

Seuss's artwork associated with Flit included numerous racial caricatures which, although not unusual for the 1920s, are now seen as racist.

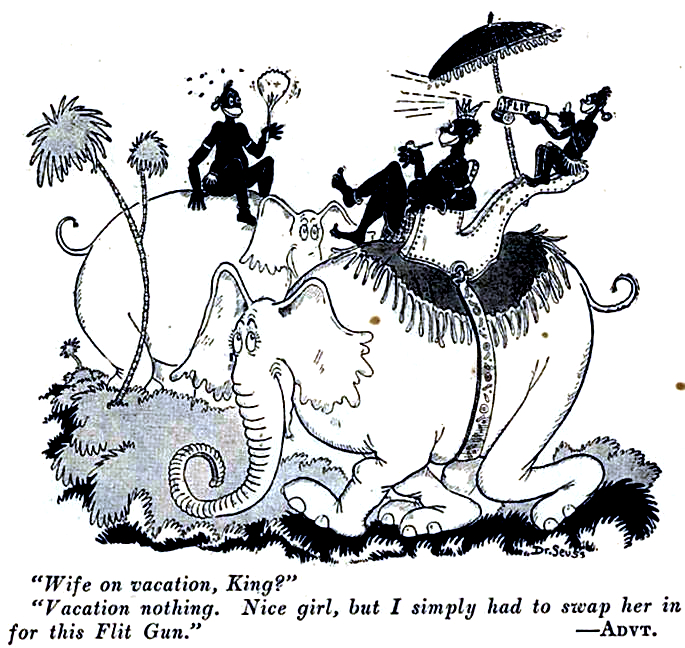
1923 Flit advertisement drawn by Dr. Seuss

This advertising campaign continued for 17 years and made "Quick, Henry, the Flit!" a popular catchphrase in the United States.

== U-2 fuel ==
According to Ben Rich (a propulsion engineer on the U2 program), some raw material (possibly the solvent) used for the production of Flit was similar to that used for LF-1A fuel for the Lockheed U-2 high altitude reconnaissance aircraft, causing a nationwide shortage of bug spray in 1955. The LF-1A fuel was produced by the Shell Oil Company.
