= Walking in Circles (album) =

Studio album by FliT
- Released: December 19, 2017 re-released 2018
- Studio: FDR Media Records
- Genre: rock; alternative rock; punk rock
- Length: 30:08
- Label: Not On Label (Self-released)

Walking in Circles is an album of rock band FliT. Released on December 19, 2017, the album consists of 9 songs. This is a re-released English version of their album that was extremely popular in Ukraine a few years ago.

== Track listing ==
No.	Title	Length
1.	"Within"	2:53
2.	"Stop It"	2:57
3.	"Unattached"	4:15
4.	"Open Your Eyes"	3:32
5.	"You're Living the Dream"	3:12
6.	"Wait Till Morning"	2:46
7.	"Today for Tomorrow"	3:46
8.	"Choices"	3:23
9.	"Walking in Circles"	3:24
Total length:		30:08

== Personnel ==
- Volodymyr Novikov — guitar, vocals
- Igor Ozarko — drums, backing vocals
- Roman Boyko — bass guitar, backing vocals
