= FireWire =

Serial bus interface standard

IEEE 1394 Interface
- Type: Serial

Production history
- Designer: Apple (1394a/b), IEEE P1394 Working Group, Sony, Panasonic, etc.
- Designed: 1986; 40 years ago
- Standardized: January 1995; 31 years ago
- Manufacturer: Various
- Produced: 1994–current
- Superseded by: Thunderbolt, USB 3.0 and SAS

General specifications
- Length: 4.5 m (15 ft) maximum
- Width: 1
- Hot pluggable: Yes
- Daisy chain: Yes, up to 63 devices
- Audio signal: Yes (software encoding)
- Video signal: Yes (software encoding)
- Pins: 4, 6, 9

Electrical
- Max. voltage: 30 V
- Max. current: 1.5 A

Data
- Data signal: Yes
- Bitrate: 1394a, half-duplex 100–400 Mbit/s (12.5–50 MB/s); 1394b and later, full-duplex 800–3200 Mbit/s (100–400 MB/s)

FireWire is a largely deprecated interface standard for a serial bus for high-speed communications and isochronous real-time data transfer. It was developed in the late 1980s and early 1990s by Apple in cooperation with a number of companies, primarily Sony and Panasonic. It is most commonly known by the Apple name FireWire, but also referred to by the Sony name i.LINK and the Texas Instruments name Lynx. Most consumer electronics manufacturers phased it out in the 2010s. The standard was also adopted by the IEEE as IEEE 1394.

The copper cable used in its most common implementation can be up to 4.5 m (15 ft) long. Power and data are carried over this cable, allowing devices with moderate power requirements to operate without a separate power supply. FireWire is also available in Cat 5 and optical fiber versions.

The 1394 interface is comparable to USB. USB was developed subsequently and gained much greater market share. USB requires a host controller whereas IEEE 1394 is cooperatively managed by the connected devices.

== History and development ==
The 6-conductor and 4-conductor alpha FireWire 400 socket

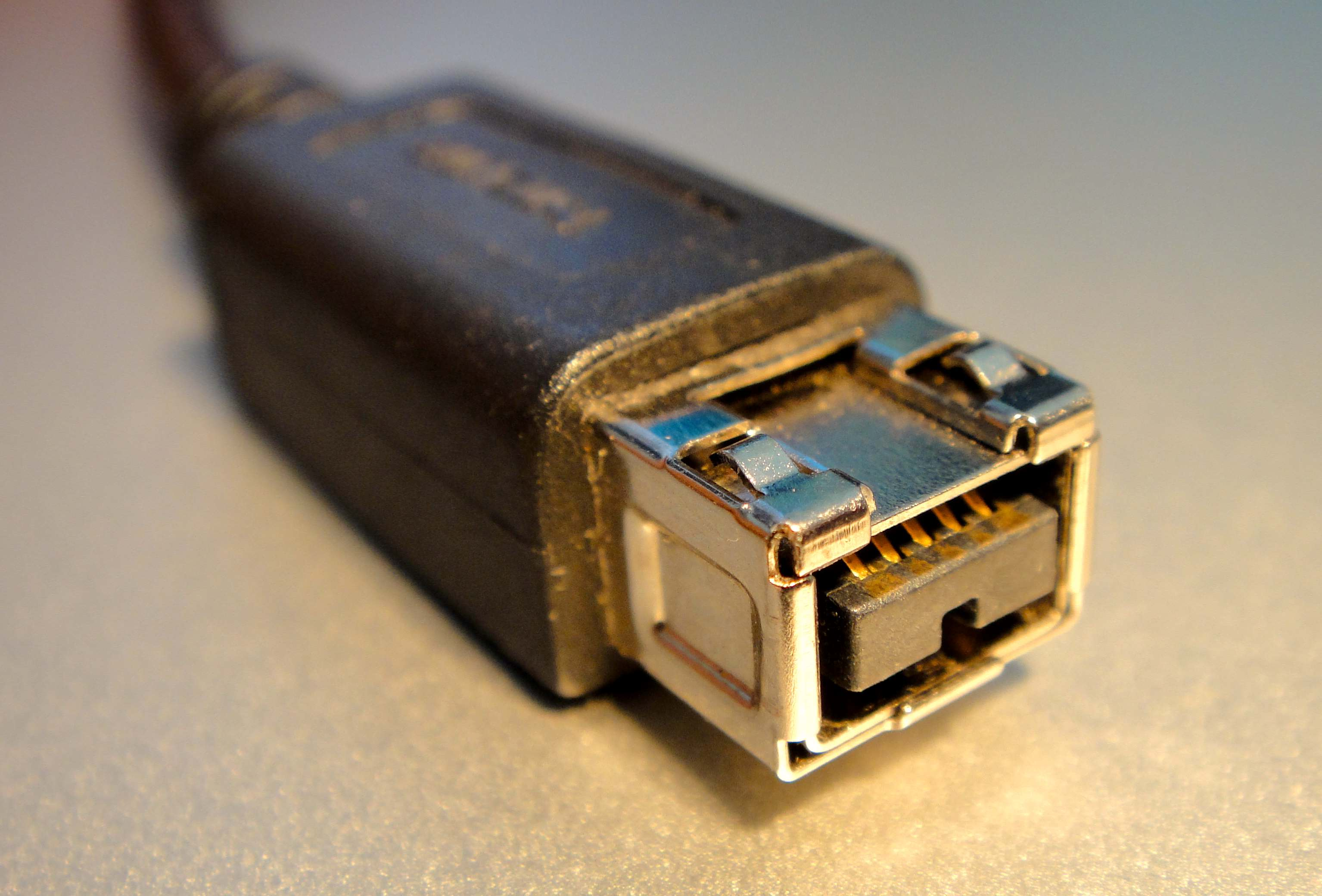
A 9-pin FireWire 800 connector

The alternative Ethernet-style cabling used by 1394c

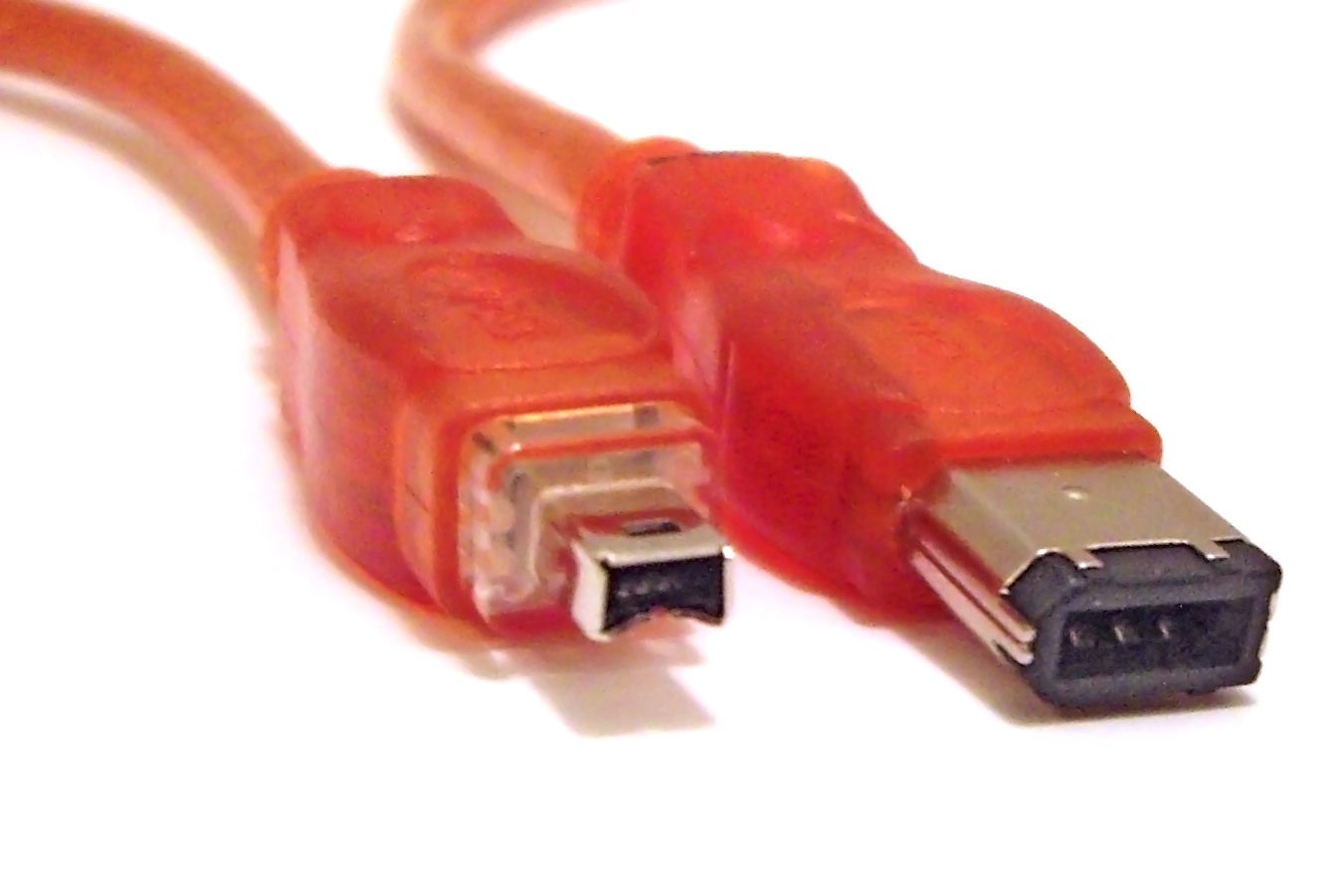
4-conductor (left) and 6-conductor (right) FireWire 400 alpha connectors

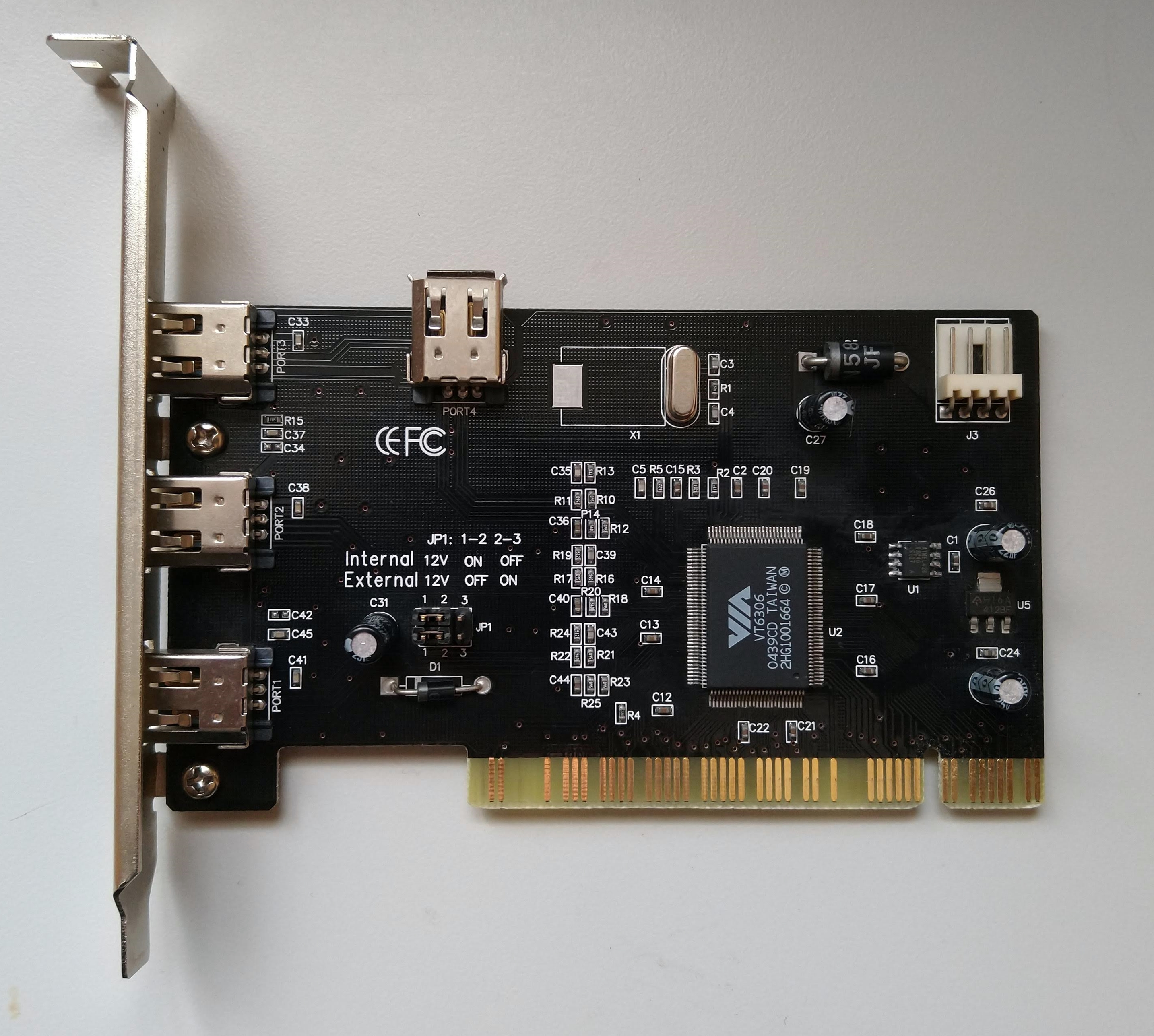
A PCI expansion card that contains four FireWire 400 connectors

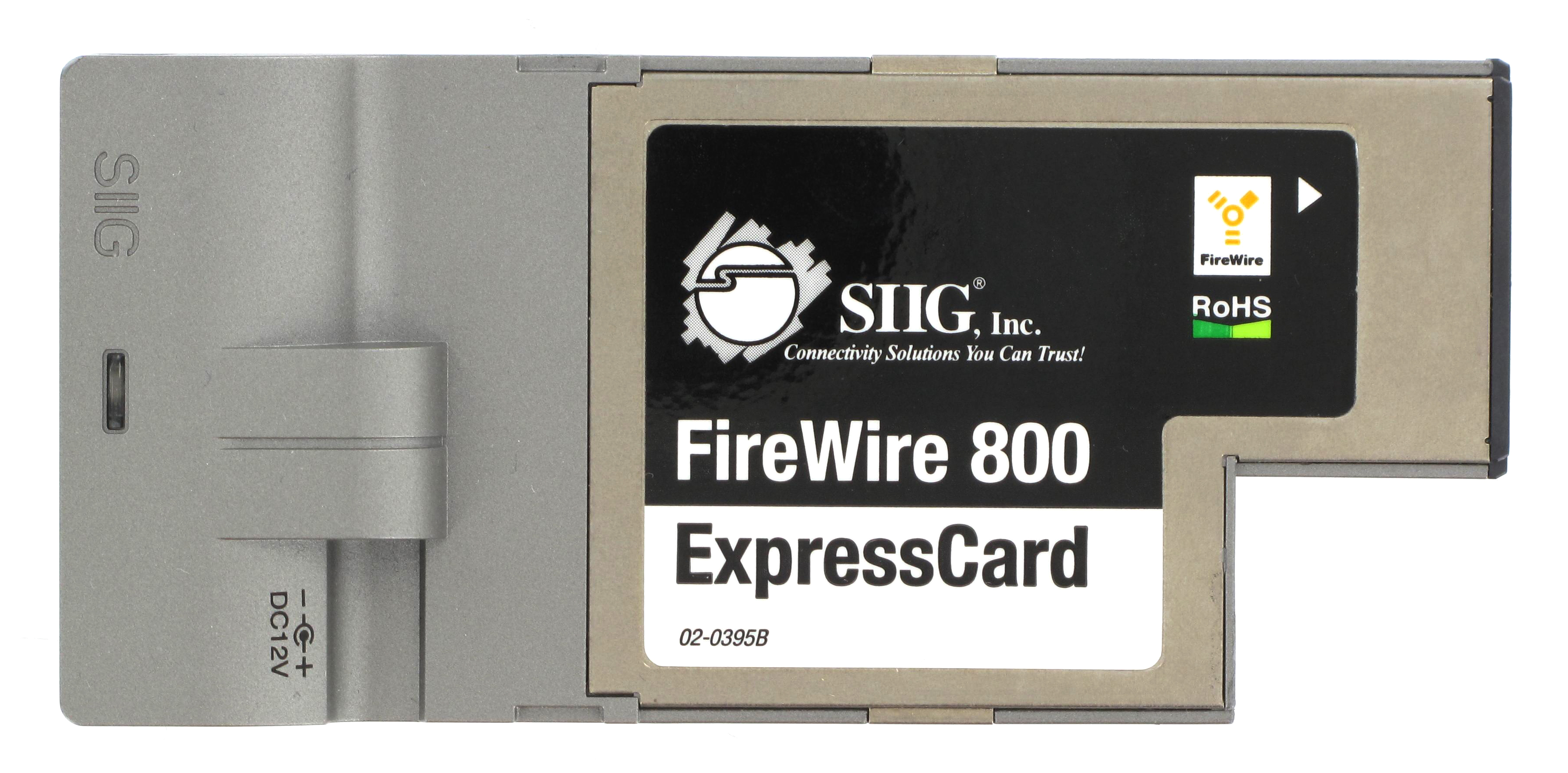
A FireWire 800 ExpressCard

FireWire is Apple's name for the IEEE 1394 High Speed Serial Bus. Its development was initiated by Apple in 1986, and developed by the IEEE P1394 Working Group, largely driven by contributions from Sony (102 patents), Apple (58 patents), Panasonic (46 patents), and Philips (43 patents), in addition to contributions made by engineers from LG Electronics, Toshiba, Hitachi, Canon, INMOS/SGS Thomson (now STMicroelectronics), and Texas Instruments.

FireWire is a serial bus architecture for high-speed data transfer, serial meaning that information is transferred one bit at a time. Parallel buses utilize a number of different physical connections, and as such are usually more costly and typically heavier. IEEE 1394 fully supports both isochronous and asynchronous applications.

Apple intended FireWire to be a serial replacement for the parallel SCSI bus, while providing connectivity for digital audio and video equipment. Apple's development began in the late 1980s, later presented to the Institute of Electrical and Electronics Engineers (IEEE), and was completed in January 1995. In 2007, IEEE 1394 was a composite of four documents: the original IEEE Std. 1394–1995, the IEEE Std. 1394a-2000 amendment, the IEEE Std. 1394b-2002 amendment, and the IEEE Std. 1394c-2006 amendment. On June 12, 2008, all these amendments as well as errata and some technical updates were incorporated into a superseding standard, IEEE Std. 1394–2008.

Apple first included onboard FireWire in some of its 1999 Mac models (though it had been a build-to-order option on some Macintosh models since 1997), and most Apple Mac computers manufactured from 2000 through 2011 included FireWire ports. However, in February 2011, Apple introduced its first Mac with Thunderbolt, which superseded FireWire. Apple released its last computers with FireWire in 2012. By 2014, Thunderbolt had become a standard feature across Apple's entire line of computers (with some exceptions), effectively becoming the spiritual successor to FireWire in the Apple ecosystem. Apple's last Mac products with FireWire, the Apple Thunderbolt Display and 2012 13-inch MacBook Pro, were discontinued in 2016. Apple sold a Thunderbolt to FireWire adapter, with a single FireWire 800 port, until 2023. A separate adapter was required to use it with Thunderbolt 3.

Sony's implementation of the system, i.LINK, used a smaller connector with only four signal conductors, omitting the two conductors that provide power for devices in favor of a separate power connector. This style was later added into the 1394a amendment. This port is sometimes labeled S100 or S400 to indicate speed in Mbit/s.

The system was commonly used to connect data storage devices and DV (digital video) cameras, but was also popular in industrial systems for machine vision and professional audio systems. Many users preferred it over the more common USB 2.0 for its then greater effective speed and power distribution capabilities. Benchmarks show that the sustained data transfer rates are higher for FireWire than for USB 2.0, but lower than USB 3.0. Results are marked on Apple Mac OS X but more varied on Microsoft Windows.

== Patent considerations ==
Implementation of IEEE 1394 was said to require the use of 261 issued international patents held by 10 corporations. Use of these patents required licensing; use without license generally constituted patent infringement. A licensing administrator sub-licensed these patents to providers of equipment implementing IEEE 1394. Under the typical patent pool license, a royalty of US$0.25 per unit was payable by the manufacturer upon the manufacture of each 1394 finished product; no royalties were payable by users.

Companies holding IEEE 1394 intellectual property formed a patent pool with MPEG LA as the license administrator, to whom they licensed patents. The last of the patents, MY 120654 by Sony, expired on November 30, 2020. As of that date, the following were patent holders of the IEEE 1394 standard, as listed in the patent pool then managed by MPEG LA, which has been defunct since 2023.

Company	Total patents
Sony	102
Apple	58
Panasonic	46
Philips	43
LG	11
Toshiba	10
Hitachi	4
Canon	1
Compaq	1
Samsung	1

A person or company was able to review the actual 1394 Patent Portfolio License upon request to the licensing administrator. The licensing administrator did not provide assurance of protection to licensees beyond its own patents. At least one formerly licensed patent is known to have been removed from the pool, and other hardware patents exist that reference IEEE 1394.

The 1394 High Performance Serial Bus Trade Association (the 1394 TA) was formed to aid the marketing of IEEE 1394. Its bylaws prohibit dealing with intellectual property issues. The 1394 Trade Association operates on an individual no cost membership basis to further enhancements to 1394 standards. The Trade Association also is the library source for all 1394 documentation and standards available.

== Technical specifications ==
FireWire can connect up to 63 peripherals in a tree or daisy-chain topology (as opposed to parallel SCSI's bus topology). It allows peer-to-peer device communication – such as communication between a scanner and a printer – to take place without using system memory or the CPU. FireWire also supports multiple host controllers per bus. It is designed to support plug and play and hot swapping. The copper cable it uses in its most common implementation can be up to 4.5 m (15 ft) long and is more flexible than most parallel SCSI cables. In its six-conductor or nine-conductor variations, it can supply up to 45 watts of power per port at up to 30 volts, allowing moderate-consumption devices to operate without a separate power supply.

FireWire devices implement the ISO/IEC 13213 configuration ROM model for device configuration and identification, to provide plug-and-play capability. All FireWire devices are identified by an IEEE EUI-64 unique identifier in addition to well-known codes indicating the type of device and the protocols it supports.

FireWire devices are organized at the bus in a tree topology. Each device has a unique self-ID. One of the nodes is elected root node and always has the highest ID. The self-IDs are assigned during the self-ID process, which happens after each bus reset. The order in which the self-IDs are assigned is equivalent to traversing the tree depth-first, post-order.

FireWire is capable of safely operating critical systems due to the way multiple devices interact with the bus and how the bus allocates bandwidth to the devices. FireWire is capable of both asynchronous and isochronous transfer methods at once. Isochronous data transfers are transfers for devices that require continuous, guaranteed bandwidth. To support both methods, FireWire dedicates a certain percentage to isochronous data and the rest to asynchronous data. In IEEE 1394, 80% of the bus is reserved for isochronous cycles, leaving asynchronous data with a minimum of 20% of the bus.

=== Encoding scheme ===
FireWire uses data strobe (D/S) encoding. In D/S encoding, two non-return-to-zero (NRZ) signals are used to transmit the data with high reliability. The NRZ signal sent is fed with the clock signal through an XOR gate, creating a strobe signal. This strobe is then put through another XOR gate along with the data signal to reconstruct the clock. This in turn acts as the bus's phase-locked loop for synchronization purposes.

=== Arbitration ===
The process of the bus deciding which node gets to transmit data at what time is known as arbitration. Each arbitration round lasts about 125 microseconds. During the round, the root node (device nearest the processor) sends a cycle start packet. All nodes requiring data transfer respond, with the closest node winning. After the node is finished, the remaining nodes take turns in order. This repeats until all the devices have used their portion of the 125 microseconds, with isochronous transfers having priority.

== Standards and versions ==
The previous standards and its three published amendments are now incorporated into a superseding standard, IEEE 1394-2008. The features individually added provide a record of the standard's development path.

=== FireWire 400 (IEEE 1394-1995) ===
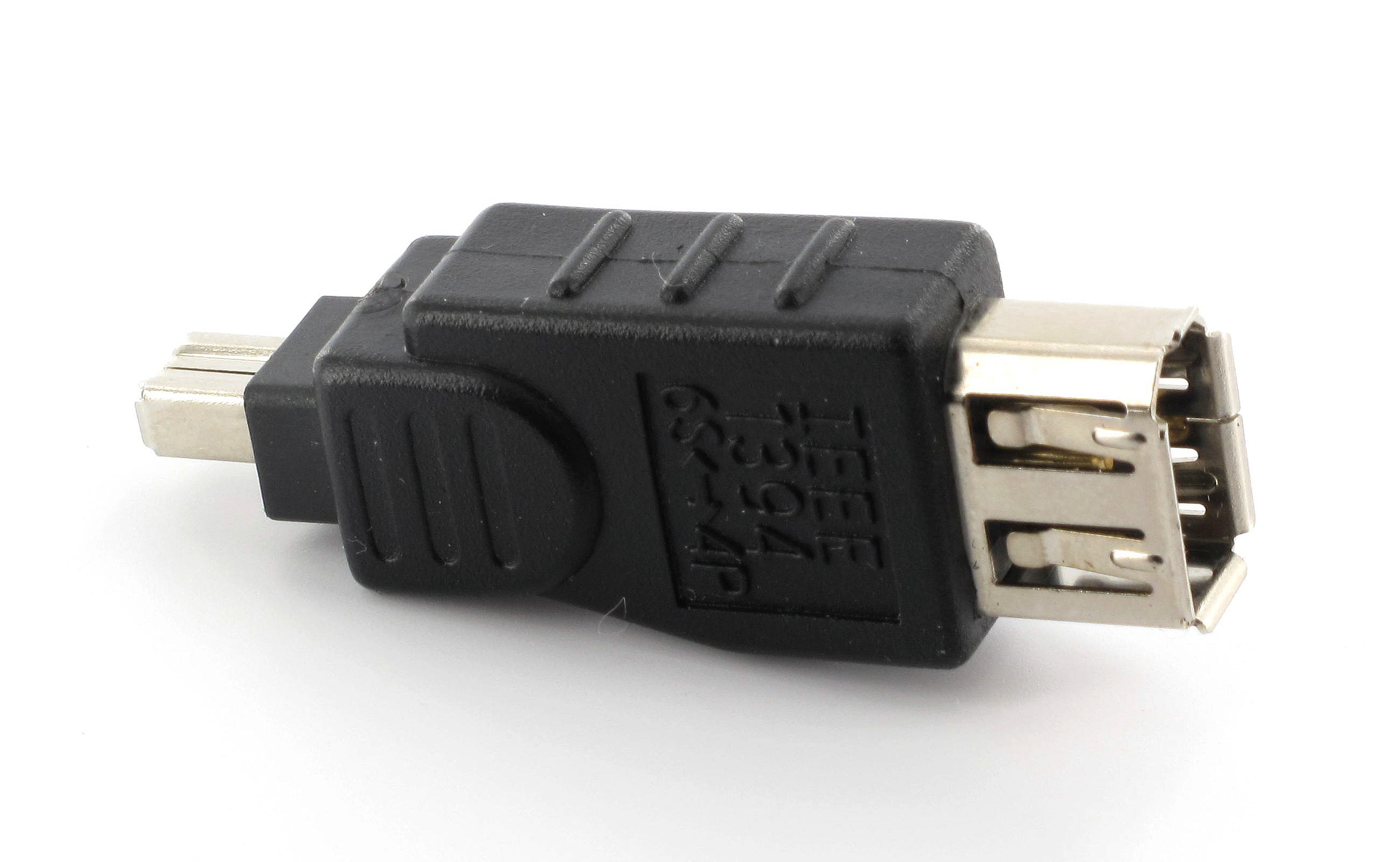
4-pin connector to 6-pin FireWire 400 Adapter

The original release of IEEE 1394-1995 specified what is now known as FireWire 400. It can transfer data between devices at 100, 200, or 400 Mbit/s half-duplex data rates (the actual transfer rates are 98.304, 196.608, and 393.216 Mbit/s, i.e., 12.288, 24.576 and 49.152 MB/s respectively). These different transfer modes are commonly referred to as S100, S200, and S400.

Cable length is limited to 4.5 m (15 ft), although up to 16 cables can be daisy chained using active repeaters, e.g., external hubs or the internal hubs that are often present in FireWire equipment. The S400 standard limits any configuration's maximum cable length to 72 m (236 ft). The 6-conductor connector is commonly found on desktop computers and can supply the connected device with power.

The 6-conductor powered connector, now referred to as an alpha connector, adds power output to support external devices. Typically a device can pull about 7 to 8 watts from the port; however, the voltage varies significantly from different devices. Voltage is specified as unregulated and should nominally be about 25 volts (range 24 to 30). Apple's implementation on laptops is typically related to battery power and can be as low as 9 V.

==== Improvements (IEEE 1394a-2000) ====
An amendment, IEEE 1394a, was released in 2000, which clarified and improved the original specification. It added support for asynchronous streaming, quicker bus reconfiguration, packet concatenation, and a power-saving suspend mode.

IEEE 1394a offers a couple of advantages over the original IEEE 1394-1995. 1394a is capable of arbitration accelerations, allowing the bus to accelerate arbitration cycles to improve efficiency. It also allows for arbitrated short bus reset, in which a node can be added or dropped without causing a big drop in isochronous transmission.

1394a also standardized the 4-conductor alpha connector developed by Sony and trademarked as i.LINK, already widely in use on consumer devices such as camcorders, most PC laptops, a number of PC desktops, and other small FireWire devices. The 4-conductor connector is fully data-compatible with 6-conductor alpha interfaces but lacks power connectors.

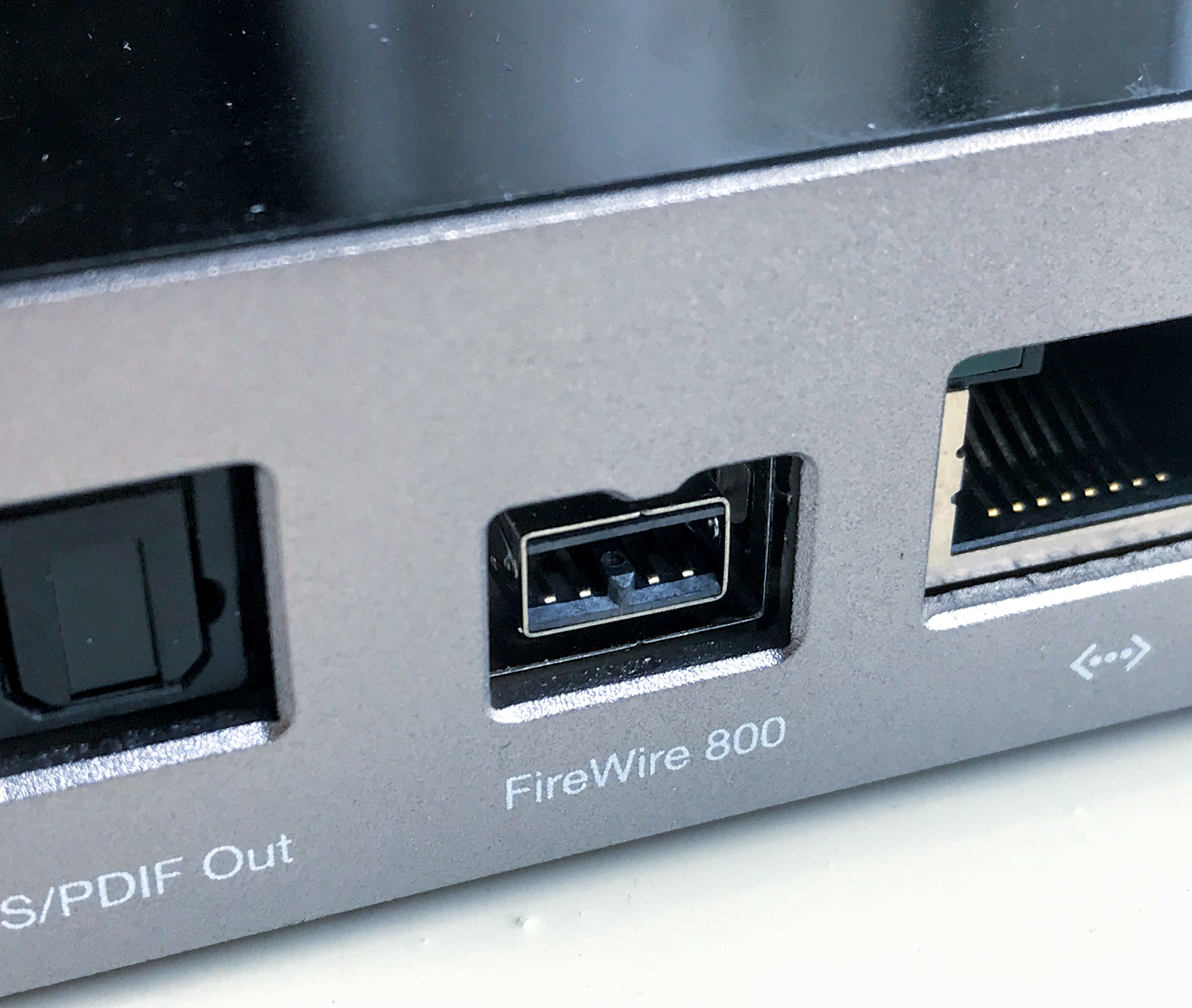
FireWire 800 port (center)

=== FireWire 800 (IEEE 1394b-2002) ===
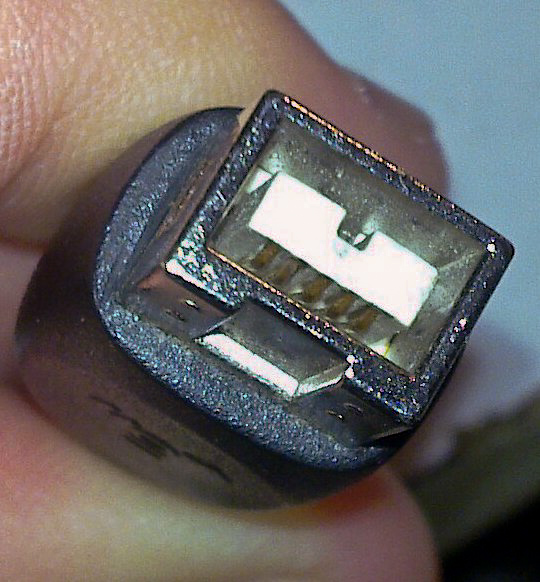
A 9-conductor bilingual connector

IEEE 1394b-2002 introduced FireWire 800 (Apple's name for the 9-conductor S800 bilingual version of the IEEE 1394b standard). This specification added a new encoding scheme termed beta mode which allowed compliant devices to operate at 786.432 Mbit/s full-duplex. It is backwards compatible with the slower rates and 6-conductor alpha connectors of FireWire 400. However, while the IEEE 1394a and IEEE 1394b standards are compatible, FireWire 800's connector, referred to as a beta connector, is different from FireWire 400's alpha connectors, making legacy cables incompatible. A bilingual cable allows the connection of older devices to the newer port. In 2003, Apple was the first to introduce commercial products with the new connector, including a new model of the Power Mac G4 and a 17" PowerBook G4.

The full IEEE 1394b specification supports data rates up to 3200 Mbit/s (i.e., 400 MB/s) over beta-mode or optical connections up to 100 m (330 ft) in length. Standard category 5e cable supports 100 m (330 ft) at S100. The original 1394 and 1394a standards used data/strobe (D/S) encoding, now known as alpha mode, with the cables, while 1394b added a data encoding scheme called 8b/10b referred to as beta mode.

Beta mode is based on 8b/10b (from Gigabit Ethernet, also used for many other protocols). 8b/10b encoding involves expanding an 8-bit data word into 10 bits, with the extra bits after the 5th and 8th data bits. The partitioned data is sent through a Running Disparity calculator function. The Running Disparity calculator attempts to keep the number of 1s transmitted equal to 0s, thereby assuring a DC-balanced signal. Then, the different partitions are sent through a 5b/6b encoder for the 5-bit partition and a 3b/4b encoder for the 3-bit partition. This gives the packet the ability to have at least two 1s, ensuring synchronization of the PLL at the receiving end to the correct bit boundaries for reliable transfer. An additional function of the coding scheme is to support the arbitration for bus access and general bus control. This is possible due to the surplus symbols afforded by the 8b/10b expansion. (While 8-bit symbols can encode a maximum of 256 values, 10-bit symbols permit the encoding of up to 1024.) Symbols invalid for the current state of the receiving PHY indicate data errors.

=== FireWire S800T (IEEE 1394c-2006) ===
IEEE 1394c-2006 was published on June 8, 2007. It provided a major technical improvement, namely new port specification that provides 800 Mbit/s over the same 8P8C (Ethernet) connectors with Category 5e cable, which is specified in IEEE 802.3 clause 40 (gigabit Ethernet over copper twisted pair) along with a corresponding automatic negotiation that allows the same port to connect to either IEEE Std 1394 or IEEE 802.3 (Ethernet) devices.

=== FireWire S1600 and S3200 ===
In December 2007, the 1394 Trade Association announced that products would be available before the end of 2008 using the S1600 and S3200 modes that, for the most part, had already been defined in 1394b and were further clarified in IEEE Std. 1394–2008. The 1.572864 Gbit/s and 3.145728 Gbit/s devices use the same 9-conductor beta connectors as the existing FireWire 800 and are fully compatible with existing S400 and S800 devices. It competes with USB 3.0.

S1600 (Symwave) and S3200 (Dap Technology) development units have been made, however because of FPGA technology DapTechnology targeted S1600 implementations first with S3200 not becoming commercially available until 2012.

Steve Jobs declared FireWire dead in 2008. As of 2012, there were few S1600 devices released, with a Sony camera being the only notable user.

=== Cancelled enhancements (including P1394d) ===
A project named IEEE P1394d was formed by the IEEE on March 9, 2009, to add single-mode fiber as an additional transport medium to FireWire. The project was withdrawn in 2013.

Other future iterations of FireWire were expected to increase speed to 6.4 Gbit/s and additional connectors such as the small multimedia interface.

== Operating system support ==
Full support for IEEE 1394a and 1394b was implemented in Microsoft Windows, FreeBSD, Linux, macOS and NetBSD.

In Windows XP, a degradation in performance of 1394 devices may have occurred with installation of Service Pack 2. This was resolved in Hotfix 885222 and in SP3. Some FireWire hardware manufacturers also provide custom device drivers that replace the Microsoft OHCI host adapter driver stack, enabling S800-capable devices to run at full 800 Mbit/s transfer rates on older versions of Windows (XP SP2 w/o Hotfix 885222) and Windows Vista. At the time of its release, Microsoft Windows Vista supported only 1394a, with assurances that 1394b support would come in the next service pack. Service Pack 1 for Microsoft Windows Vista has since been released, however the addition of 1394b support is not mentioned anywhere in the release documentation. The 1394 bus driver was rewritten for Windows 7 to provide support for higher speeds and alternative media.

In Linux, support was originally provided by libraw1394 making direct communication between user space and IEEE 1394 buses. Subsequently, a new kernel driver stack, nicknamed JuJu, has been implemented.

IEEE 1394 drivers are no longer included in Windows by default since Windows 10. FireWire support was removed from macOS in macOS Tahoe 26. Support for FireWire in Linux is planned to be deprecated after 2029.

== Cable TV system support ==
Under FCC Code 47 CFR 76.640 section 4, subsections 1 and 2, Cable TV providers (in the US, with digital systems) must, upon request of a customer, have provided a high-definition capable cable box with a functional FireWire interface. This applied only to customers leasing high-definition capable cable boxes from their cable provider after April 1, 2004. The interface can be used to display or record Cable TV, including HDTV programming. In June 2010, the FCC issued an order that permitted set-top boxes to include IP-based interfaces in place of FireWire.

== Comparison with USB ==
While both technologies provide similar end results, there are fundamental differences between USB and FireWire. USB requires the presence of a host controller, typically a PC, which connects point to point with the USB device. This allows for simpler (and lower-cost) peripherals, at the cost of lowered functionality of the bus. Intelligent hubs are required to connect multiple USB devices to a single USB host controller. By contrast, FireWire is essentially a peer-to-peer network (where any device may serve as the host or client), allowing multiple devices to be connected on one bus.

The FireWire host interface supports DMA and memory-mapped devices, allowing data transfers to happen without loading the host CPU with interrupts and buffer-copy operations. Additionally, FireWire (in 1394b) features two data buses for each segment of the bus network, whereas, until USB 3.0, USB featured only one. While this means that FireWire can physically have communication in both directions at the same time (full-duplex), this is used to overlap bus arbitration with data transmission. 1394b is still only half-duplex for data transmission. USB communication prior to 3.0 can only occur in one direction at any one time (half-duplex).

While USB 2.0 expanded into the fully backwards-compatible USB 3.0 and 3.1 (using the same main connector type), FireWire used a different connector between 400 and 800 implementations.

== Common applications ==
=== Consumer automobiles ===
IDB-1394 Customer Convenience Port (CCP) was the automotive version of the 1394 standard.

=== Consumer audio and video ===
IEEE 1394 was the High-Definition Audio-Video Network Alliance (HANA) standard connection interface for A/V (audio/visual) component communication and control. HANA was dissolved in September 2009 and the 1394 Trade Association assumed control of all HANA-generated intellectual property.

=== Military and aerospace vehicles ===
SAE Aerospace standard AS5643 originally released in 2004 and reaffirmed in 2013 establishes IEEE-1394 standards as a military and aerospace databus network in those vehicles. AS5643 is utilized by several large programs, including the F-35 Lightning II, the X-47B UCAV aircraft, AGM-154 weapon and JPSS-1 polar satellite for NOAA. AS5643 combines existing 1394-2008 features like looped topology with additional features like transformer isolation and time synchronization, to create deterministic double and triple fault-tolerant data bus networks.

=== General networking ===
FireWire can be used for ad hoc (terminals only, no routers except where a FireWire hub is used) computer networks. Specifically, RFC 2734 specifies how to run IPv4 over the FireWire interface, and RFC 3146 specifies how to run IPv6.

Mac OS X, Linux, and FreeBSD include support for networking over FireWire. Windows 95, Windows 98, Windows Me, Windows XP and Windows Server 2003 include native support for IEEE 1394 networking. Windows 2000 does not have native support but may work with third party drivers. A network can be set up between two computers using a single standard FireWire cable, or by multiple computers through use of a hub. This is similar to Ethernet networks with the major differences being transfer speed, conductor length, and the fact that standard FireWire cables can be used for point-to-point communication.

On December 4, 2004, Microsoft announced that it would discontinue support for IP networking over the FireWire interface in all future versions of Microsoft Windows. Consequently, support for this feature is absent from Windows Vista and later Windows releases. Microsoft rewrote their 1394 driver in Windows 7 but networking support for FireWire is not present. Unibrain offers free FireWire networking drivers for Windows called ubCore, which support Windows Vista and later versions.

Earlier models of the PlayStation 2 console (SCPH 1000x to 3900x series) had an i.LINK-branded 1394 connector. This was used for networking until the release of an Ethernet adapter later in the console's lifespan, but very few software titles supported the feature. The connector was removed from the SCPH 5000x series onward.

=== IIDC ===
IIDC (Instrumentation & Industrial Digital Camera) is the FireWire data format standard for live video, and is used by Apple's iSight A/V camera. The system was designed for machine vision systems but is also used for other computer vision applications and for some webcams. Although they are easily confused since they both run over FireWire, IIDC is different from, and incompatible with, the ubiquitous AV/C (Audio Video Control) used to control camcorders and other consumer video devices.

=== DV ===
Digital Video (DV) is a standard protocol used by some digital camcorders. All DV cameras that recorded to tape media had a FireWire interface (usually a 4-conductor). All DV ports on camcorders only operate at the slower 100 Mbit/s speed of FireWire. This presents operational issues if the camcorder is daisy chained from a faster S400 device or via a common hub because any segment of a FireWire network cannot support multiple speed communication.

Labeling of the port varied by manufacturer, with Sony using either its i.LINK trademark or the letters DV. Many digital video recorders have a DV-input FireWire connector (usually an alpha connector) that can be used to record video directly from a DV camcorder (computer-free). The protocol also accommodates remote control (play, rewind, etc.) of connected devices, and can stream time code from a camera.

USB is unsuitable for the transfer of the video data from tape because tape by its very nature does not support variable data rates. USB relies heavily on processor support and this was not guaranteed to service the USB port in time. The later move away from tape towards solid-state memory or disc media (e.g., SD Cards, optical disks or hard drives) has facilitated moving to USB transfer because file-based data can be moved in segments as required.

=== Frame grabbers ===
IEEE 1394 interface is commonly found in frame grabbers, devices that capture and digitize an analog video signal; however, IEEE 1394 is facing competition from the Gigabit Ethernet interface (citing speed and availability issues).

=== iPod and iPhone synchronization and charging ===
iPods released prior to the iPod with Dock Connector used IEEE 1394a ports for transferring music files and charging, but in 2003, the FireWire port in iPods was succeeded by Apple's dock connector and IEEE 1394 to 30-pin connector cables were made. Apple began removing backwards compatibility with FireWire cables starting with the first generation iPod nano and fifth generation iPod, both of which could only sync via USB but retained the ability to charge through FireWire. This was also carried over to the second and third generation nanos as well as the iPod Classic. Backwards compatibility was removed completely beginning with the iPhone 3G, second generation iPod touch, and the fourth generation iPod nano, all of which could only charge and sync via USB.

== Security issues ==
Devices on a FireWire bus can communicate by direct memory access (DMA), where a device can use hardware to map internal memory to FireWire's physical memory space. The SBP-2 (Serial Bus Protocol 2) used by FireWire disk drives uses this capability to minimize interrupts and buffer copies. In SBP-2, the initiator (controlling device) sends a request by remotely writing a command into a specified area of the target's FireWire address space. This command usually includes buffer addresses in the initiator's FireWire Physical Address Space, which the target is supposed to use for moving I/O data to and from the initiator.

On many implementations, particularly those like PCs and Macs using the popular OHCI, the mapping between the FireWire physical memory space and device physical memory is done in hardware, without operating system intervention. While this enables high-speed and low-latency communication between data sources and sinks without unnecessary copying (such as between a video camera and a software video recording application, or between a disk drive and the application buffers), this can also be a security or media rights-restriction risk if untrustworthy devices are attached to the bus and initiate a DMA attack. One of the applications known to exploit this to gain unauthorized access to running Windows, Mac OS and Linux computers is the spyware FinFireWire. For this reason, high-security installations typically either use newer machines that map a virtual memory space to the FireWire physical memory space (such as a Power Mac G5, or any Sun workstation), disable relevant drivers at operating system level, disable the OHCI hardware mapping between FireWire and device memory, physically disable the entire FireWire interface, or opt to not use FireWire or other hardware like PCMCIA, PC Card, ExpressCard or Thunderbolt, which expose DMA to external components.

An unsecured FireWire interface can be used to debug a machine whose operating system has crashed, and in some systems for remote-console operations. Windows natively supported this scenario of kernel debugging, but the Windows 10 Creators Update and later no longer includes this ability out of the box. On FreeBSD, the dcons driver provides both, using gdb as debugger. Under Linux, firescope and fireproxy exist.

== See also ==
- DMA attack
- HAVi
- Linux IEEE 1394 target
- List of interface bit rates
- Pin control attack
