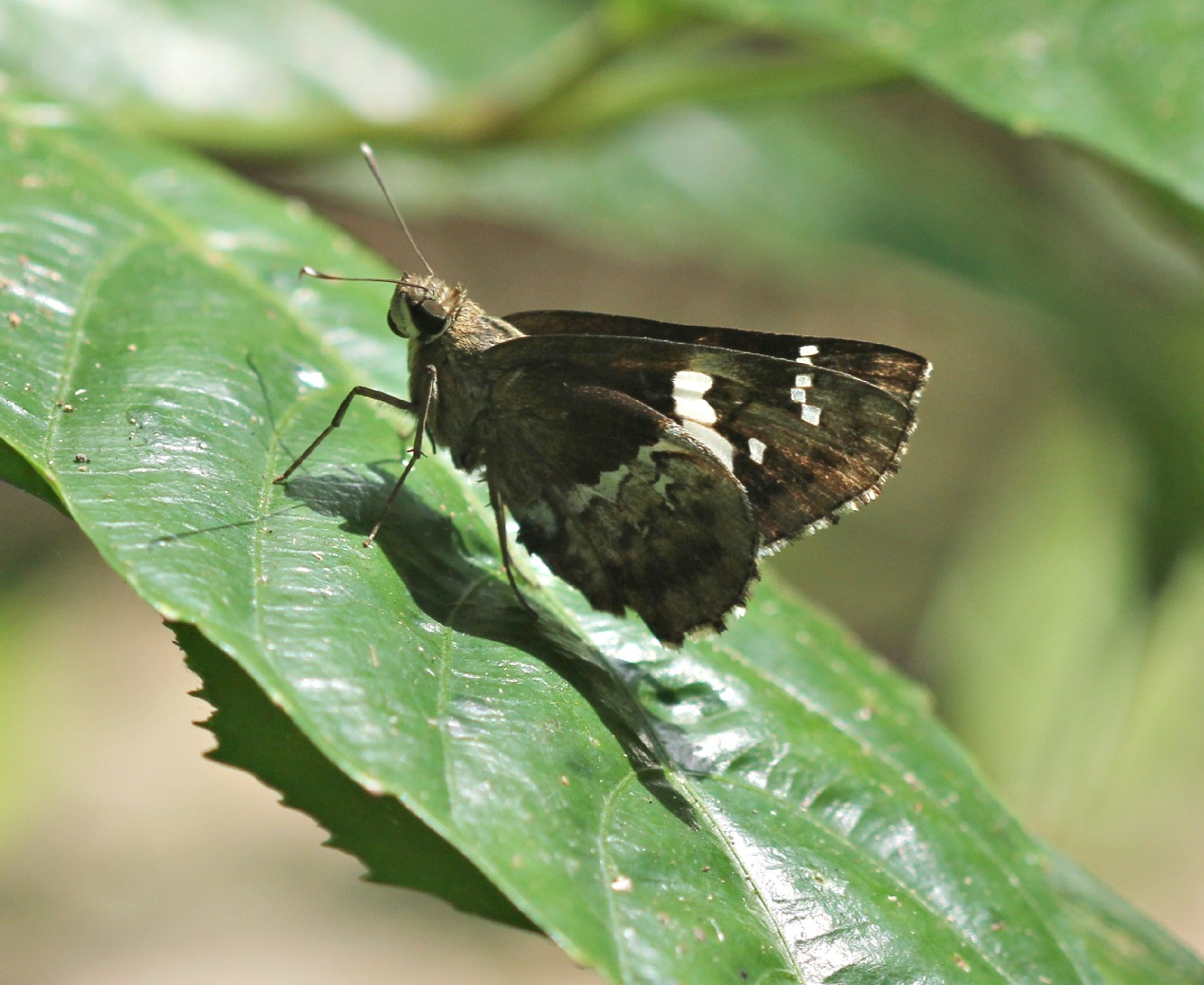

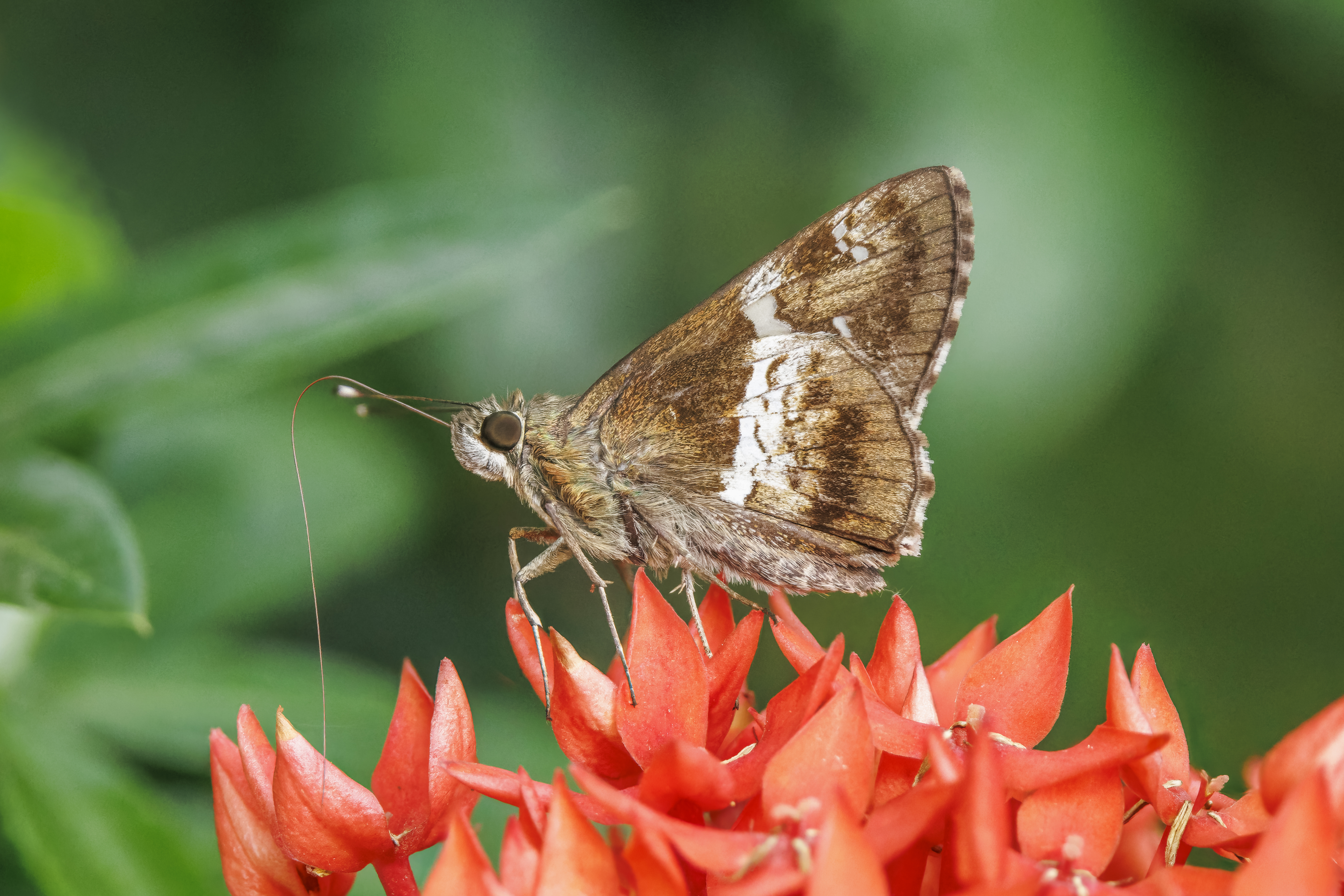

Scientific classification
- Kingdom: Animalia
- Phylum: Arthropoda
- Clade: Pancrustacea
- Class: Insecta
- Order: Lepidoptera
- Family: Hesperiidae
- Genus: Hyarotis
- Species: H. adrastus

Binomial name
- Hyarotis adrastus (Cramer, 1780)

= Hyarotis adrastus =

Tree flitter

Species of butterfly

Hyarotis adrastus, the tree flitter, is a butterfly belonging to the family Hesperiidae found in South Asia and Southeast Asia.

== Description ==
Male and female, dark chocolate-brown. Upperside, forewing with three small conjugated subapical semi-transparent white spots, three similar and larger discal spots, and a fourth above them within the cell. Underside darker brown basally, paler exteriorly; forewing with spots as above, bordered externally by a suffused dark brown streak; hindwing with a double series of white dark brown-outer-bordered lunules crossing the middle of the wing, beyond which is a submarginal series of suffused dark brown spots. Palpi, thorax, and abdomen beneath pale greyishbrown. Legs brown. Cilia yellowish- white, spotted with pale brown.

— Edward Yerbury Watson

== Distribution ==
Bengal. (Moore in P. Z. S.) Recorded from Ceylon (Hutchison, Wade, Mackwood); Andamans, Cachar (Wood-Mason and de Nicéville); Sikkim (de Nicéville; Elwes); Calcutta (de Nicéville); Kumaon (Doherty); Kangra, N.-W. Himalayas (Moore) Orissa (Taylor); Nilgiris (Hampson).Burma, Andamans, Thailand, Laos, Vietnam, Hainan, Hong Kong, Malaysia, Tioman, Singapore, Borneo, Sumatra, Java, Palawan, Philippines.
