= Flit gun =

Insecticide sprayer

FLIT manual spray pump for insecticides from 1928

A Flit gun is a hand-pumped insecticide sprayer used to dispense FLIT, a brand-name insecticide widely used against flies and mosquitoes between 1928 and the mid-1950s. Although named after the well-known brand, "Flit gun" became a generic name for this type of dispenser. Once commonly found in households, hand-operated Flit guns have been replaced by aerosol spray cans and fallen out of common use.

== Design description ==
A Flit gun consists of a pneumatic pump cylinder with a hand-operated piston to force air through an air nozzle in the front. Below the front of the pneumatic tube hangs a cylindrical container which acts as a reservoir for liquid insecticide, this reservoir being set at 90 degrees to the pneumatic tube. In early versions, the reservoir is permanently secured to the pump and equipped with a removable, gasketed screw cap for filling. In later, improved versions, the insecticide reservoir is secured to the pump with a coarse screw fitting and a seal of cork composite or gasket paper, so that it can readily be unscrewed for filling. A venturi tube extends from the pump cylinder downward into the reservoir and the upper end of the venturi is positioned in front of a nozzle on the air pump. When a jet of high-velocity air exits the pump and streams across end of the venturi tube, it lowers the pressure in the venturi (Venturi effect and Bernoulli's principle), drawing insecticide upward from the reservoir, which then atomizes the liquid as it is entrained in the air jet (it is an atomizer nozzle). With each vigorous forward stroke of the pump handle a burst of spray is produced, similar to that of a modern aerosol spray can.

== Uses in popular culture ==
- In 1927, Dr. Seuss gained wider exposure after one of his cartoons in the magazine Judge featured Flit, eventually securing Seuss a 17-year ad campaign for the company, which supported his family through the Great Depression.
- In the 1930 Marx Brothers film Animal Crackers, Harpo Marx pours a chloroform-like substance into a Flit sprayer. Although the movie apparently didn't secure rights to show the Flit logo on-screen (the words "FLIT" on the sprayer are colored over directly on prints of the film), Flit used its appearance in the film for its print advertising, in an early example of film tie-in advertising.
- In Ernest Hemingway's 1938 short story, "The Butterfly and the Tank", the central character uses a flit gun to spray patrons of a bar in Madrid with Eau de Cologne during the Spanish Civil War, setting off a melee that ends poorly.
- In Roald Dahl's 1972 book Charlie and the Great Glass Elevator, the spray for aging was delivered in a Flit gun while in Minusland in the 3rd edition with Quentin Blake's illustrations.
- "The Flit Gun" is a poem by Pam Ayres, first published in Some More Of Me Poetry (1976).
- In C.W. McCall's 1976 song "Crispy Critters" the storyteller tells the deputy sheriff "Roy, go get your Flit gun." in response to hippies moving in to the town of Telluride. The inference being that the hippies were pests that needed to be eradicated.
- In the second prologue of Stephen King's 1979 science fiction thriller novel The Dead Zone, Gregory Stillson uses a Flit gun to spray ammonia in the face of a farm dog, establishing Stillson as the book's villain.
- Stanley, the main character in the 1983 videogame Donkey Kong 3, sprays insecticide from a Flit-style sprayer.
- Schwartz, a character in the 1983 American Christmas comedy film A Christmas Story, tells his friends Ralphie and Flick on their way to school that he's getting his Old Man a Flit gun for Christmas.
- Sarah questions Hoggle as he uses a Flit-style sprayer against minuscule fairies in the 1986 film, Labyrinth. The fairies are resentful, as the one Sarah cossets bites her in reply.
- Ray Romano uses a Flit Gun to banish his floating mother in the season 2 intro of "Everybody Loves Raymond".
- In Field of Dreams, Terence Mann (James Earl Jones) uses a Flit gun to get rid of Ray Kinsella (Kevin Costner) who he believes to be a ghost from the 1960s.
- Australian stand-up comedian Carl Barron has lampooned the device in some of his shows, referring to it as a "Mortein pump-action bazooka spray".
- In the Tintin adventure The Calculus Affair a flit gun is used by Captain Haddock against both insects and a human attacker.
