= MikroTik =

Company based in Riga, Latvia

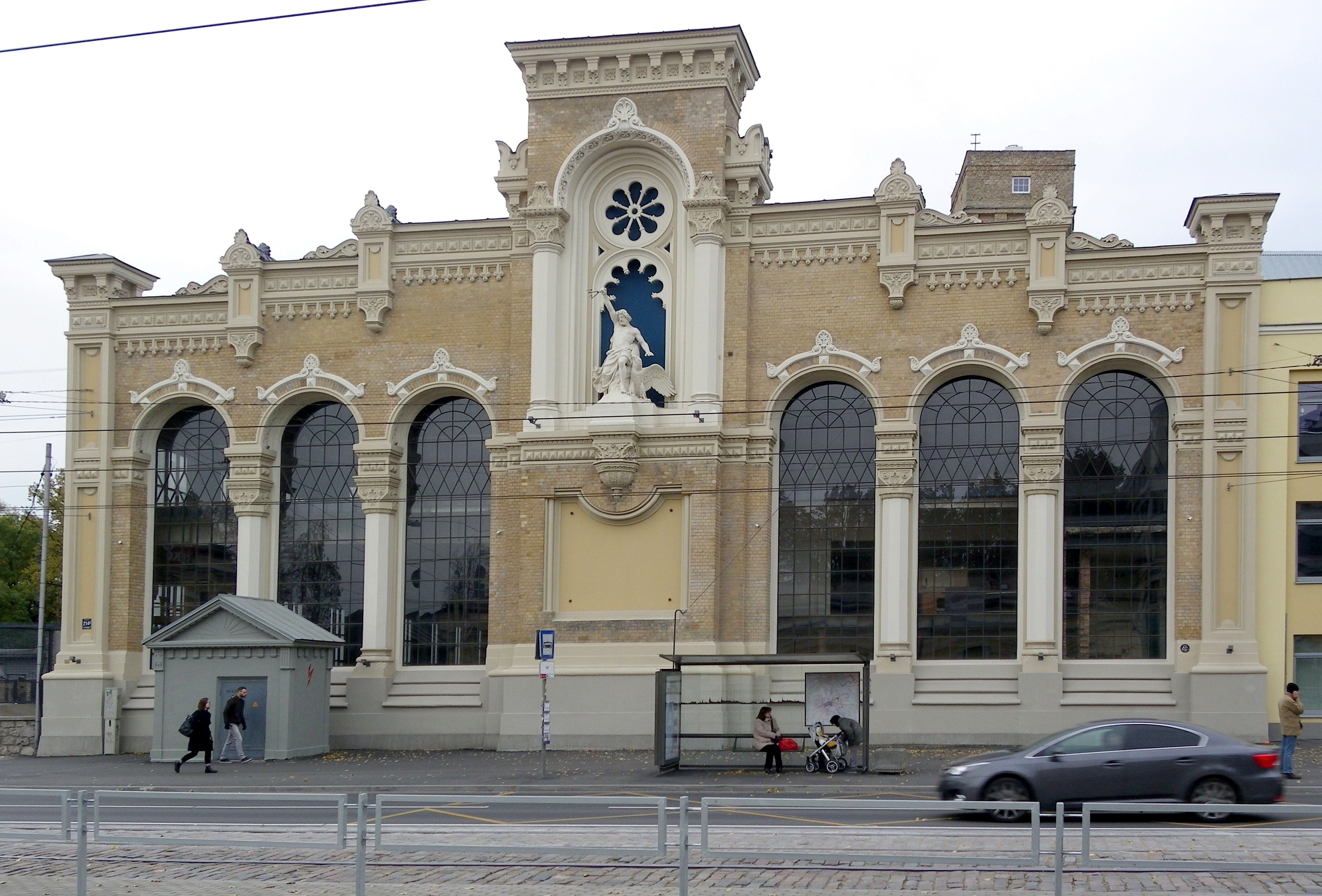
- MikroTik headquarters in Riga
- Type: Private
- Industry: Networking hardware; Networking software; Information technology
- Founded: March 14, 1996; 30 years ago in Riga, Latvia
- Headquarters: Riga, Latvia
- Area served: Worldwide
- Key people: John Tully (CEO); Arnis Riekstiņš (CTO)
- Products: routers, firewalls, software (RouterOS)
- Revenue: ▲€ 344.6 million (2025)
- Net income: ▼€ 36.1 million (2025)
- Total assets: 457,431,259 (2023)
- Owner: John Tully (50%); Arnis Riekstiņš (50%)
- Number of employees: 384 (2025)
- Website: mikrotik.com

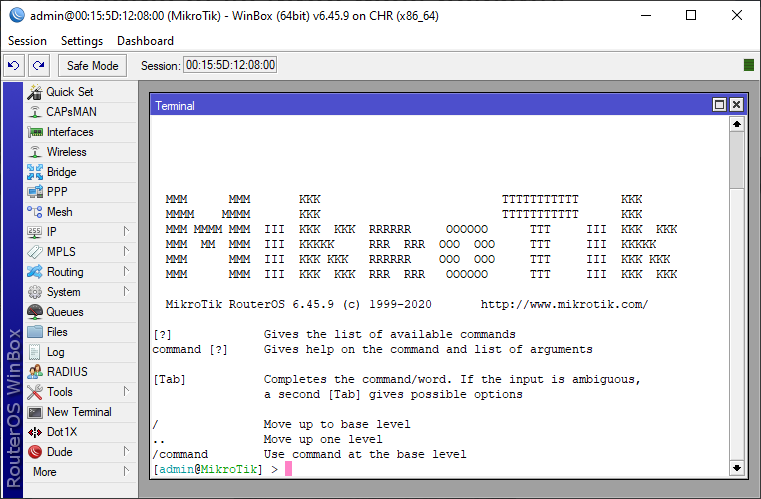
WinBox displaying RouterOS shell

MikroTik (officially SIA "Mikrotīkls") is a Latvian network equipment manufacturing company. MikroTik develops and sells wired and wireless network routers, network switches, access points, as well as operating systems and auxiliary software. The company was founded in 1996, and as of 2025, it was reported that the company had 384 employees.

With its headquarters in Riga, Latvia, MikroTik serves a diverse array of customers around the world. The company's products and services are utilized in various sectors, such as telecommunications, government agencies, educational institutions, and enterprises of all sizes.

In 2022, with a value of €1.30 billion, Mikrotik was the 4th largest company in Latvia and the first private company to surpass €1 billion value in Latvia.

== History ==
MikroTik was established in 1996 by founders John Tully and Arnis Riekstiņš in Riga, Latvia, developing networking software for x86 PC hardware that would develop into a product called RouterOS. The earliest versions of RouterOS were based on Linux 2.2.

In 2002, MikroTik expanded its product line by producing their own networking-focused low-power single-board computers (SBC), branded RouterBoard, that ran RouterOS. These early SBCs could be expanded and/or integrated as components of other systems, but as time passed, this RouterBoard/RouterOS platform would develop into a full line of network equipment.

=== Timeline ===
==== 1997 ====
- Release of software for x86 PC platform, called simply MikroTik Router Software, based on Linux 2.0, that would eventually develop into RouterOS.. Original requirement is at least 8 MiB RAM.

==== 1999 ====
- First stable RouterOS release based on Linux 2.2, adding support for PCI wireless cards (802.11b).

==== 2001 ====
- First stable RouterOS v2 release, based on Linux 2.4, introduced hotspot, HTB, OSPF, BGP, and RADIUS client.
- First stable WinBox release.

==== 2002 ====
- Release of RouterBoard series PCI add-in boards to be used with MikroTik x86-based PCs running RouterOS.

==== 2003 ====
- First stable Netinstall release.
- All MikroTik RouterOS appliances have at least 8 MiB flash and 8 MiB RAM.
- Release of RouterBoard 200, a single-board router platform with miniPCI and memory card slots, and RouterBOARD 220 with the SBC integrated into an enclosure with a 2.4 GHz wireless array antenna (SISO) powered by power over Ethernet (PoE). Original RouterBoard was based on the Geode CPU.
- Release of the RB230 RouterBoard, MikroTik's first DDR SDRAM, PCMCIA, PoE-out, and cellular-ready appliance and upgradeable to 512 MiB RAM.

==== 2004 ====
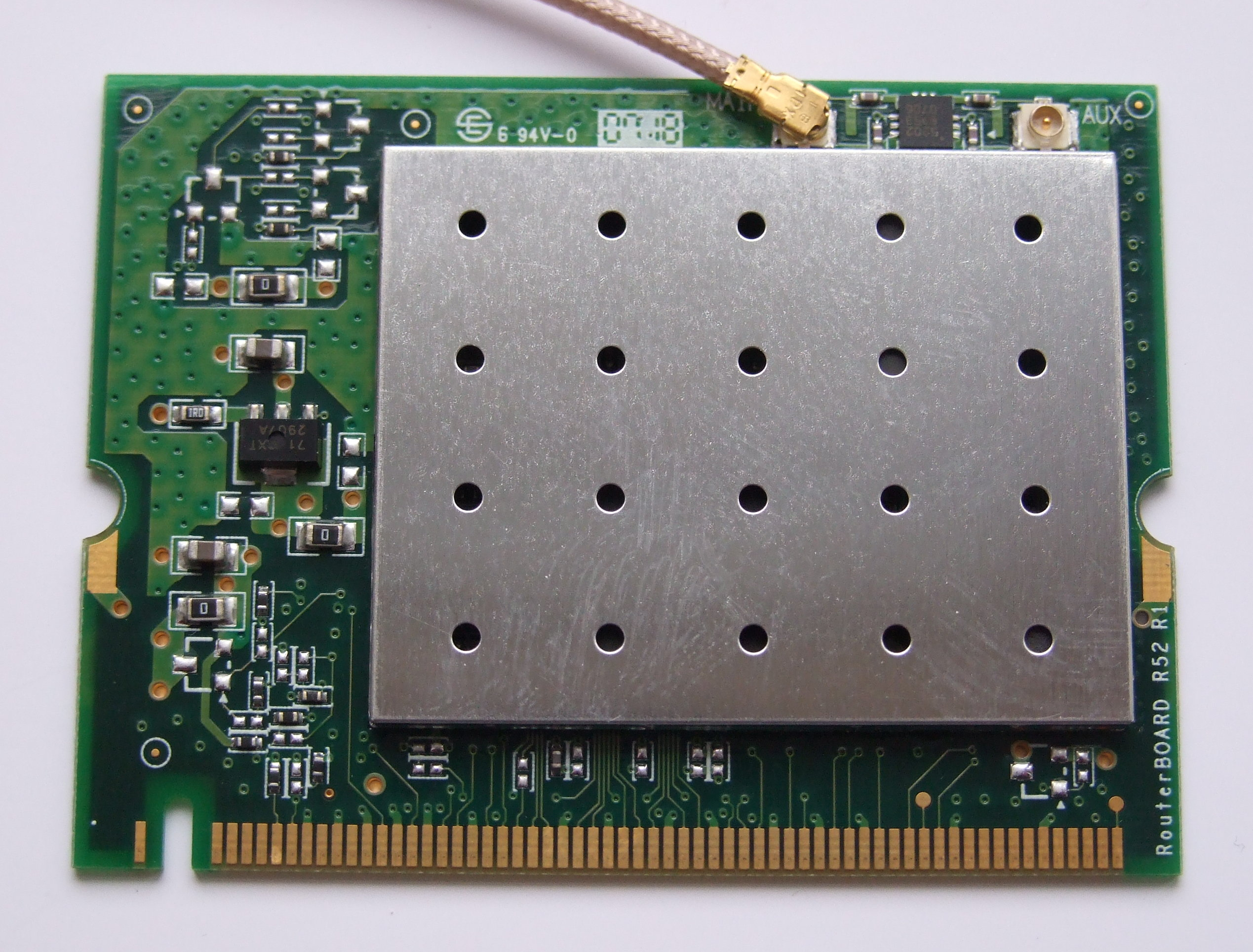
R52 card with two U.FL connectors

- Release of the RB532 RouterBoard, MikroTik's first ruggedized and MIPS hardware (in little endian mode) and supporting Nstreme, with 48V power input and expandable to 6 miniPCI slots.
- Release of the R52, MikroTik's first miniPCI card and dual band (selectable), Wi-Fi 2, and Wi-Fi 3 device.

==== 2005 ====
- Release of MikroTik's first high power and MMCX cards.
- First stable RouterOS release with both stable Nstreme and wireless 802.1X.

==== 2006 ====
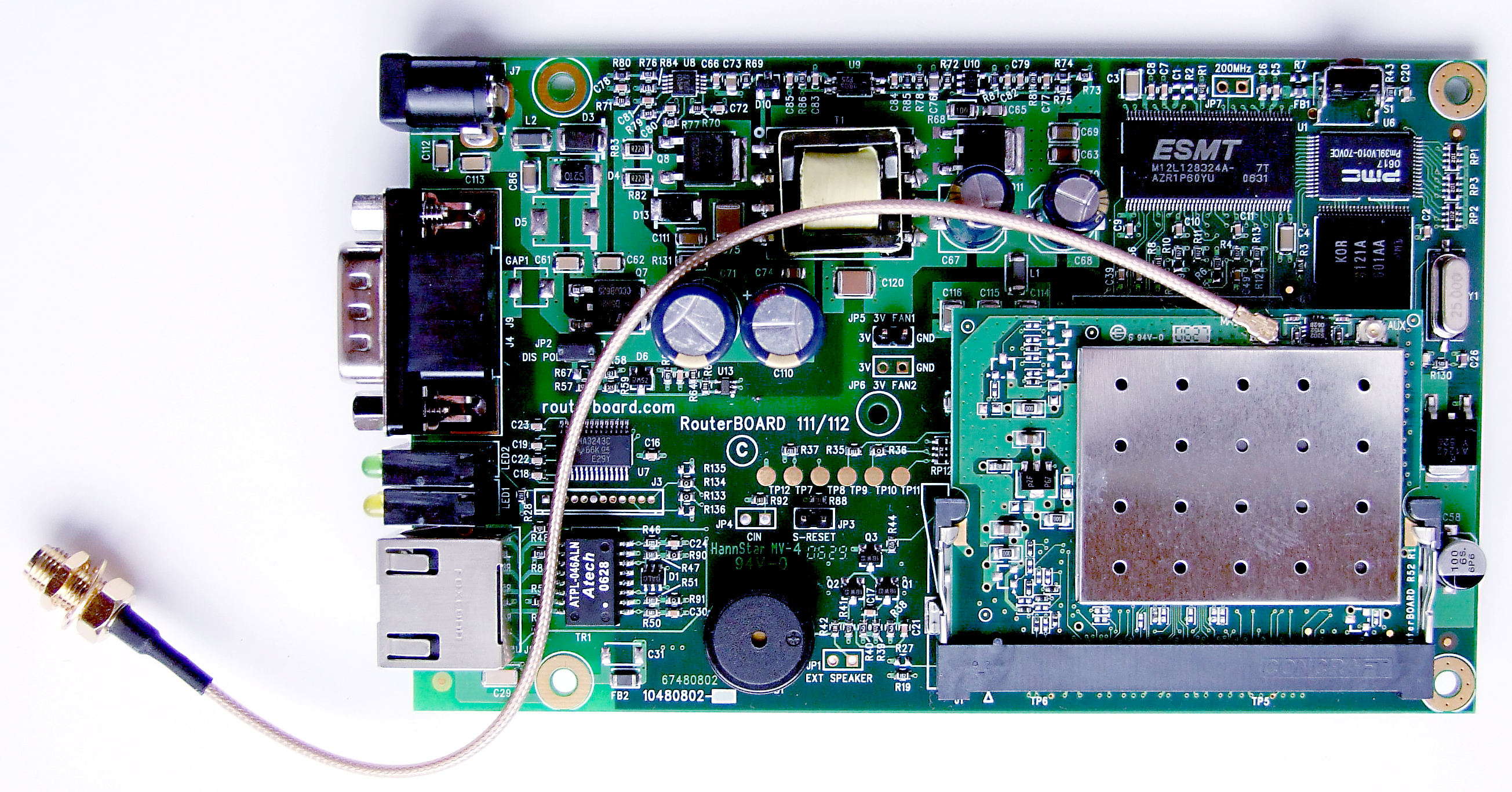
RB112 with RSMA pigtail and R52 card

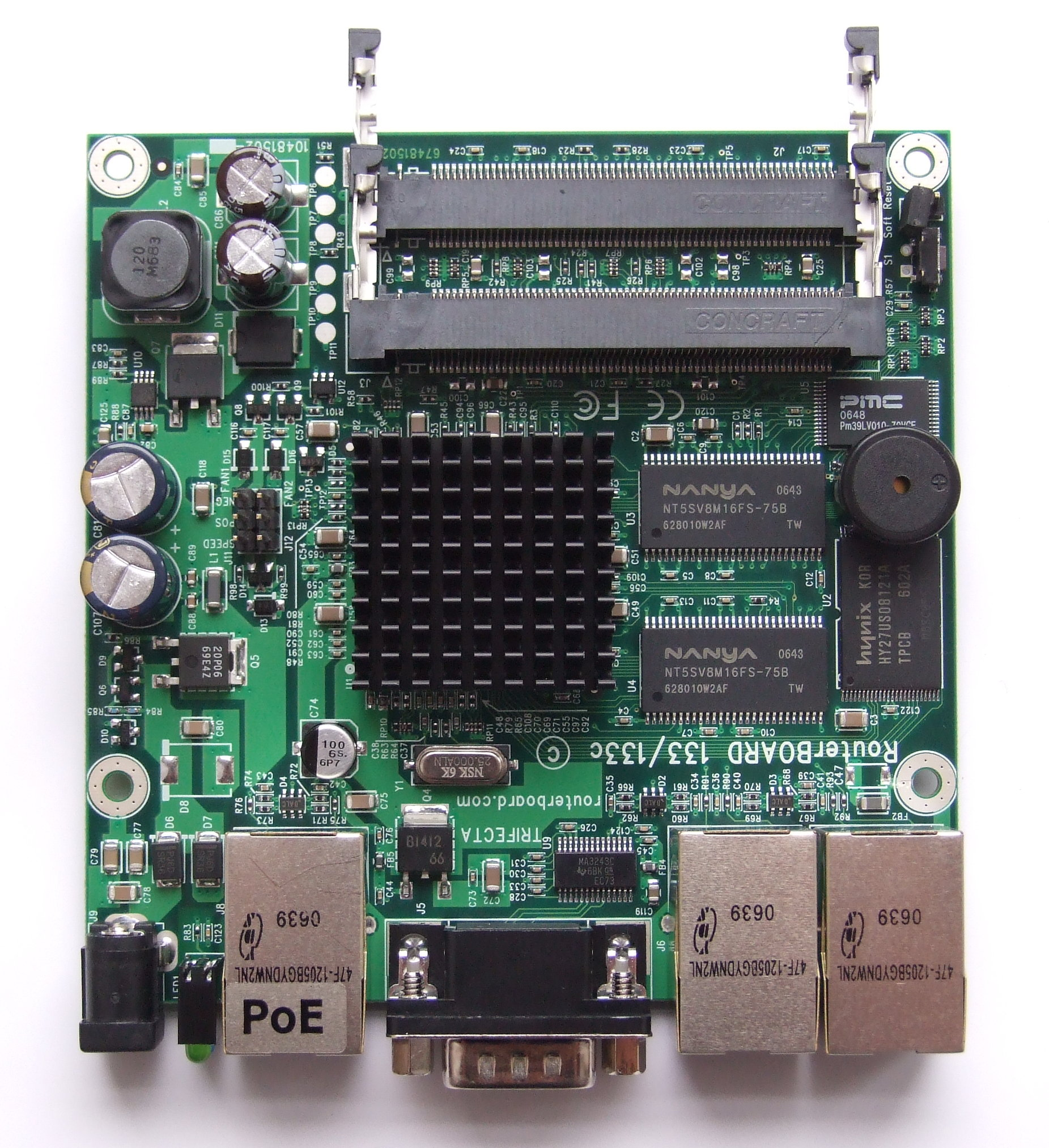
RB133 with two miniPCI slots on the top

- First MikroTik User Meeting (MUM).
- Release of the RB112, world's first $49 2-radio ready outdoor CPE and MikroTik's first product with expansion headers.
- All new RouterOS appliances introduced after the RB112 have at least 16 MiB RAM.
- All new RouterOS appliances introduced after the RB133c have at least 16 MiB flash and 32 MiB RAM.
- Release of the RB133, world's most affordable professional board with 3 minPCI slots.
- Release of the R52H, MikroTik's first high power dual band (selectable) device.
- First stable User Manager release.
- First stable Nstreme2 release.

==== 2007 ====
- Release of the RB150 RouterBoard, MikroTik's first SOHO appliance.
- Release of the RB333 RouterBoard, MikroTik's first PowerPC, MIMO-ready appliance and supporting HWMP+.

==== 2008 ====
- First stable RouterOS v3 release, based on Linux 2.6, includes SMP, MPLS/VPLS, PIM-SM, OpenVPN, and HWMP+ support.
- Release of the RB600 RouterBoard, MikroTik's first native quad miniPCI and gigabit appliance.
- Release of the RB411 RouterBoard, MikroTik's first MIPS appliance in big endian mode and with actual active 802.3af and supporting Nv2.
- Release of the RB433 RouterBoard, world's most affordable board capable of actually supporting 3 radios and MikroTik's best selling board ever.
- Release of the RB433AH RouterBoard, MikroTik's first microSD appliance.
- Release of the RB1000 RouterBoard, MikroTik's first DDR2 SDRAM and hardware encryption appliance and upgradeable to 2 GiB RAM.
- Release of the RB450 RouterBoard, MikroTik's first wired-only SOHO and redundant power appliance.
- Release of the RB411U RouterBoard, MikroTik's first USB, miniPCIe, EDGE, and 3G cellular-ready appliance, and with SIM card and both miniPCI and miniPCIe slots.
- Release of the R52n wireless card, MikroTik's first MIMO card and Wi-Fi 4 device.
- First stable The Dude release.

==== 2009 ====
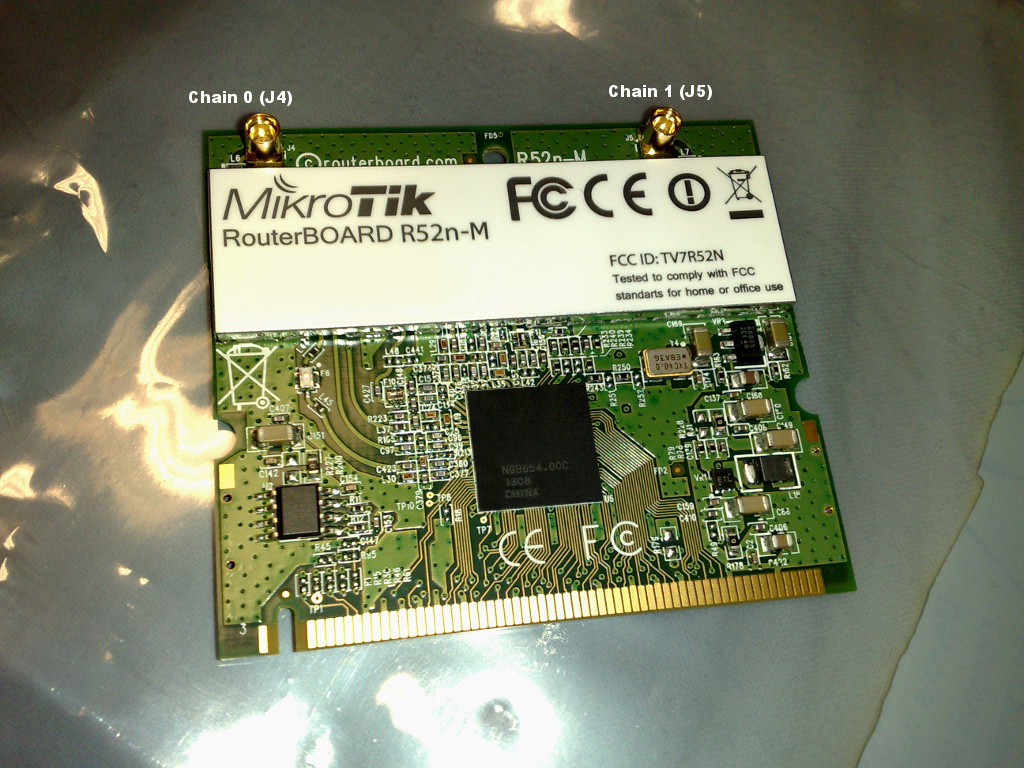
R52n-M card top view showing MMCX

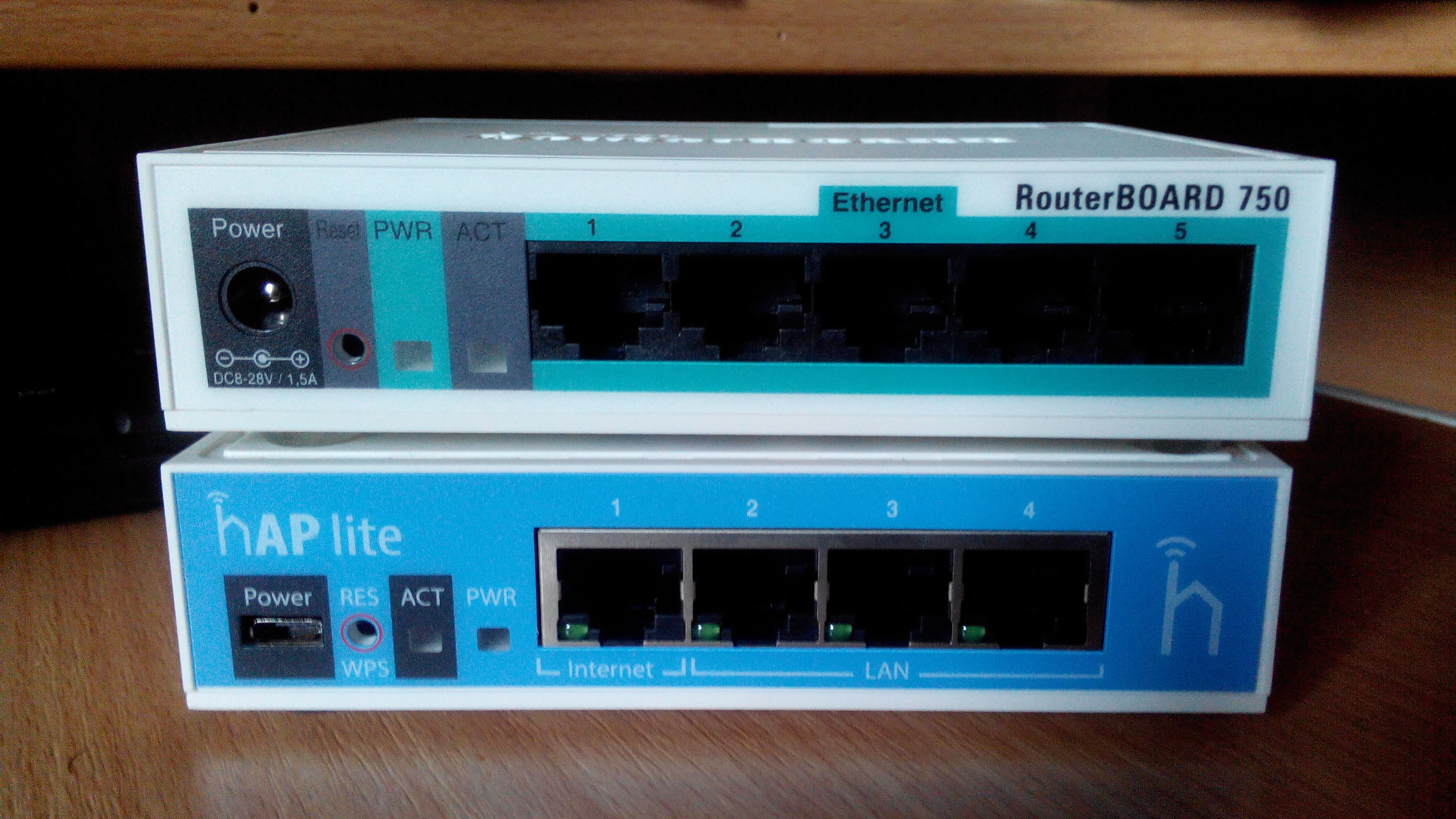
Two MikroTik routers, RB750 on top

- Release of the RB433UAH RouterBoard, MikroTik's first dual USB and triple dedicated storage appliance.
- Release of the RB450G RouterBoard, MikroTik's first gigabit SOHO appliance.
- Release of the R52n-M wireless card, MikroTik's first medium power Wi-Fi 4 device with MMCX.
- Release of the RB750 router, MikroTik's first device with CPU and switch integrated in the same chip and fully assembled SOHO appliance.
- Release of the RB750G router, MikroTik's first fanless gigabit appliance.
- Release of the RB800 RouterBoard, MikroTik's first appliance with 1 miniPCIe plus 4 miniPCI expandable to 4 additional miniPCI slots.
- First stable MetaROUTER release.
- First stable RouterOS v4 release, based on Linux 2.6, includes Wi-Fi 4 and Lua scripting support .
- Release of the R52Hn wireless card, MikroTik's first high power MIMO and Wi-Fi 4 device.

==== 2010 ====
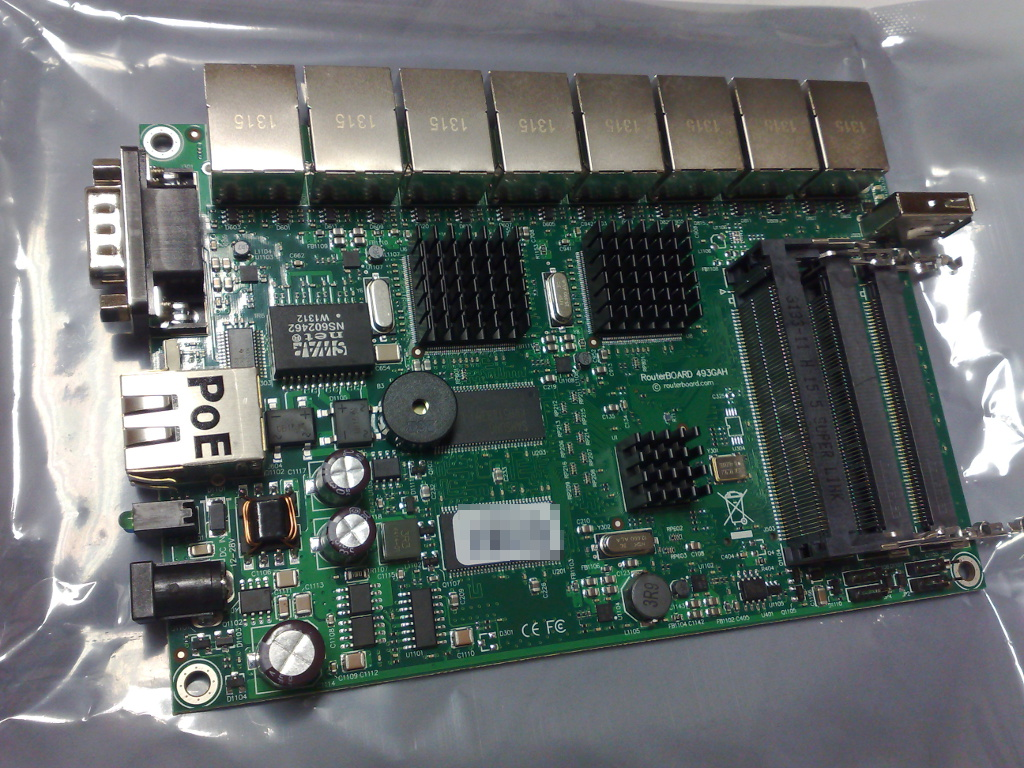
RB493G top view

- Release of the RB250GS switch, first SwOS and MCU-based appliance and without discrete RAM and only 16 KiB RAM and 128 KiB flash, and device with an Intel MCS-51-compatible MCU (with a RISC backend).
- Release of the RB1100 router, MikroTik's first SATA and dedicated rackmount appliance.
- Release of the RB493G RouterBoard, world's first SOHO router with more than 8 gigabit ports.

==== 2011 ====
- Release of the SXT 5HnD router, MikroTik's first integrated 2x2 directional outdoor appliance and with a MIMO array antenna.
- Release of the RB711-5Hn access point, MikroTik's first integrated 5GHz 802.11n bare board.
- Release of The Groove 5Hn, MikroTik's first zero-loss device and world's smallest fully featured outdoor router.
- Release of the RB711-2Hn access point, MikroTik's first integrated 2.4GHz 802.11n bare board.
- First stable releases of IPv6 and RouterOS v5, based on Linux 2.6.35, introducing WebFig, Nv2, SSTP, GRE, and WPS.
- Release of the OmniTIK UPA-5HnD router, MikroTik's first bottom entry, with an integrated omnidirectional antenna, and outdoor PoE-out appliance.
- Release of the RB750GL router, MikroTik's first gigabit device with CPU and switch integrated in the same chip.
- Release of the RB711UA-2HnD access point, MikroTik's first integrated high power 2.4GHz MIMO board.
- Release of the RB751U-2HnD router, MikroTik's first integrated dual chain appliance and with an internal antenna (2) and USB power output reset.
- Release of the RB1100AHx2 router, MikroTik's first dual core and dual built-in power supply appliance.
- Release of the RB2011LS router, MikroTik's first SFP appliance.
- Release of MikroTik's first SFP modules.

==== 2012 ====
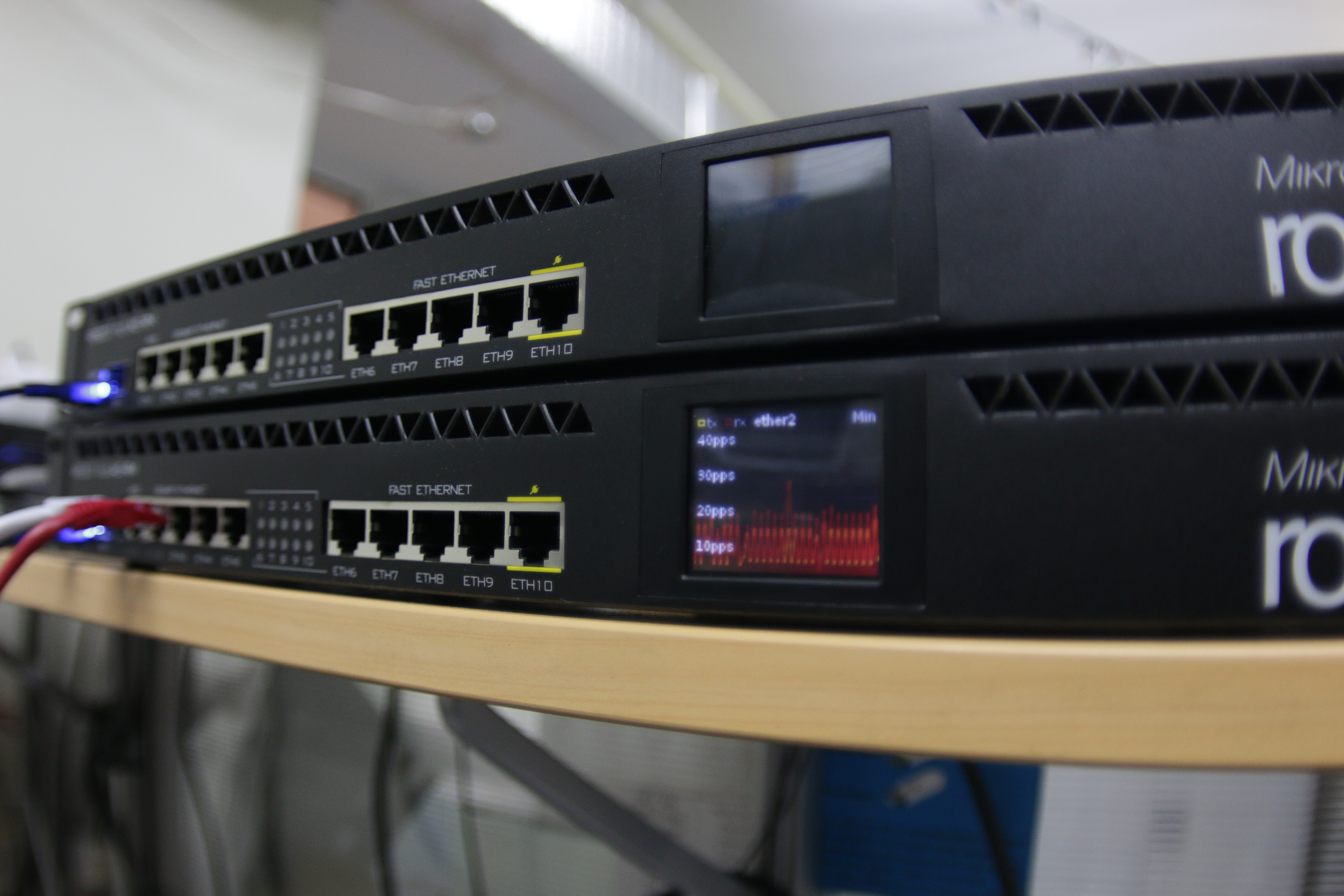
RB2011UiAS-RM rack-mountable router

- Release of the Metal 2 router, MikroTik's first fully assembled ruggedized hardware.
- Release of the RB750UP router, MikroTik's first SOHO PoE-out appliance.
- Release of the RB2011UAS-2HnD-IN, MikroTik's first touchscreen and microUSB appliance.
- Release of MikroTik's first SFP+ modules.
- Release of MikroTik's first SFP+ Direct Attach Cables.
- Release of the CCR1036-12G-4S Cloud Core Router, world's first 36-core router and with 24 million pps throughput under $1000 and first MikroTik appliance with DDR3, SFP+, 10GbE, a Tilera 64-bit TILE-Gx many-core CPU, 1 GiB flash and at least 4 GiB RAM upgradeable to 16 GiB.
- Release of the RB2011UiAS-RM, MikroTik's first dedicated rackmount device with a software-toggleable PoE-out port.

==== 2013 ====
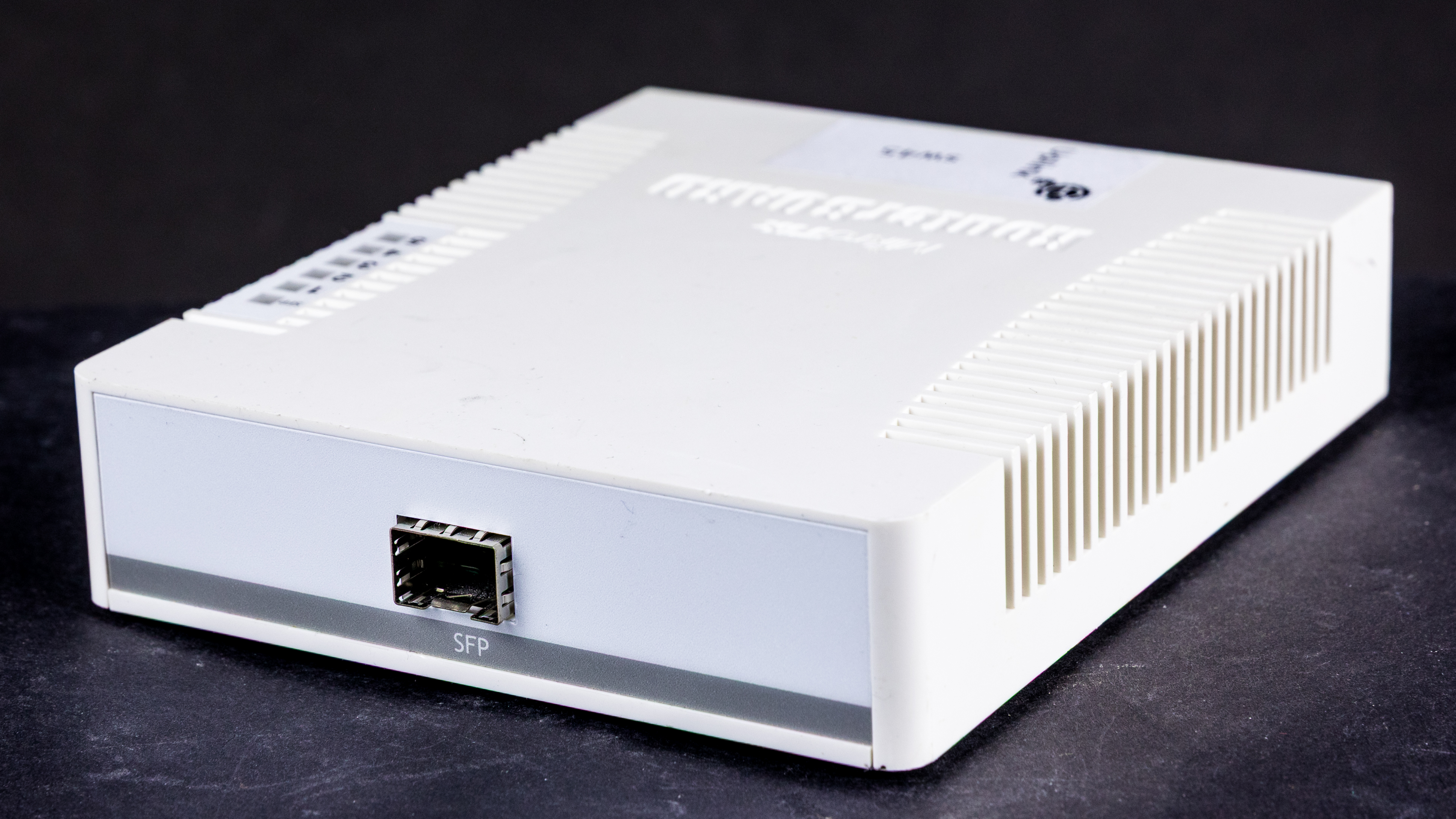
RouterBoard RB260GS - 5x gigabit Ethernet smart switch - SFP at the back

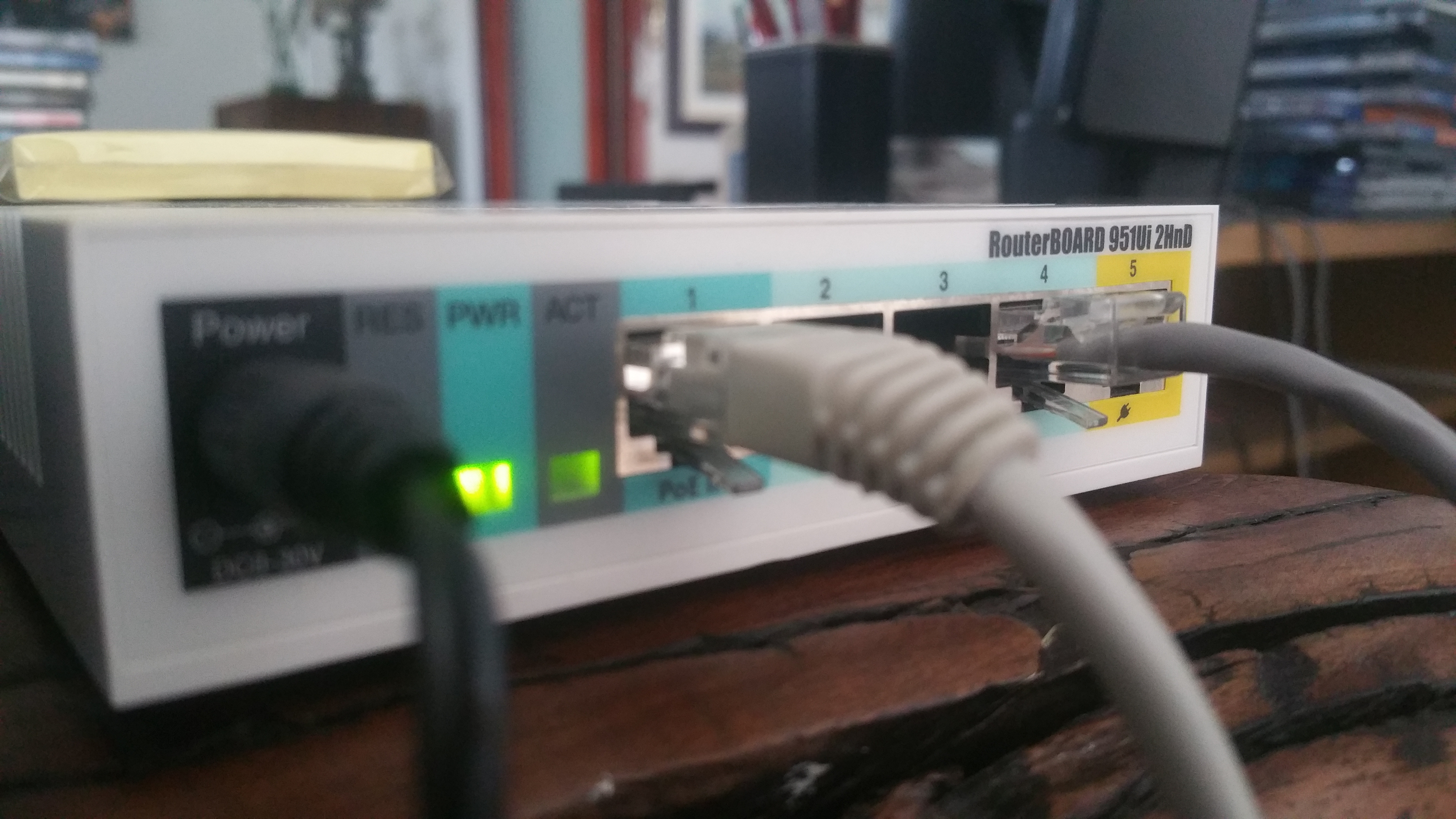
RB951Ui-2HnD 2.4 GHz wireless router

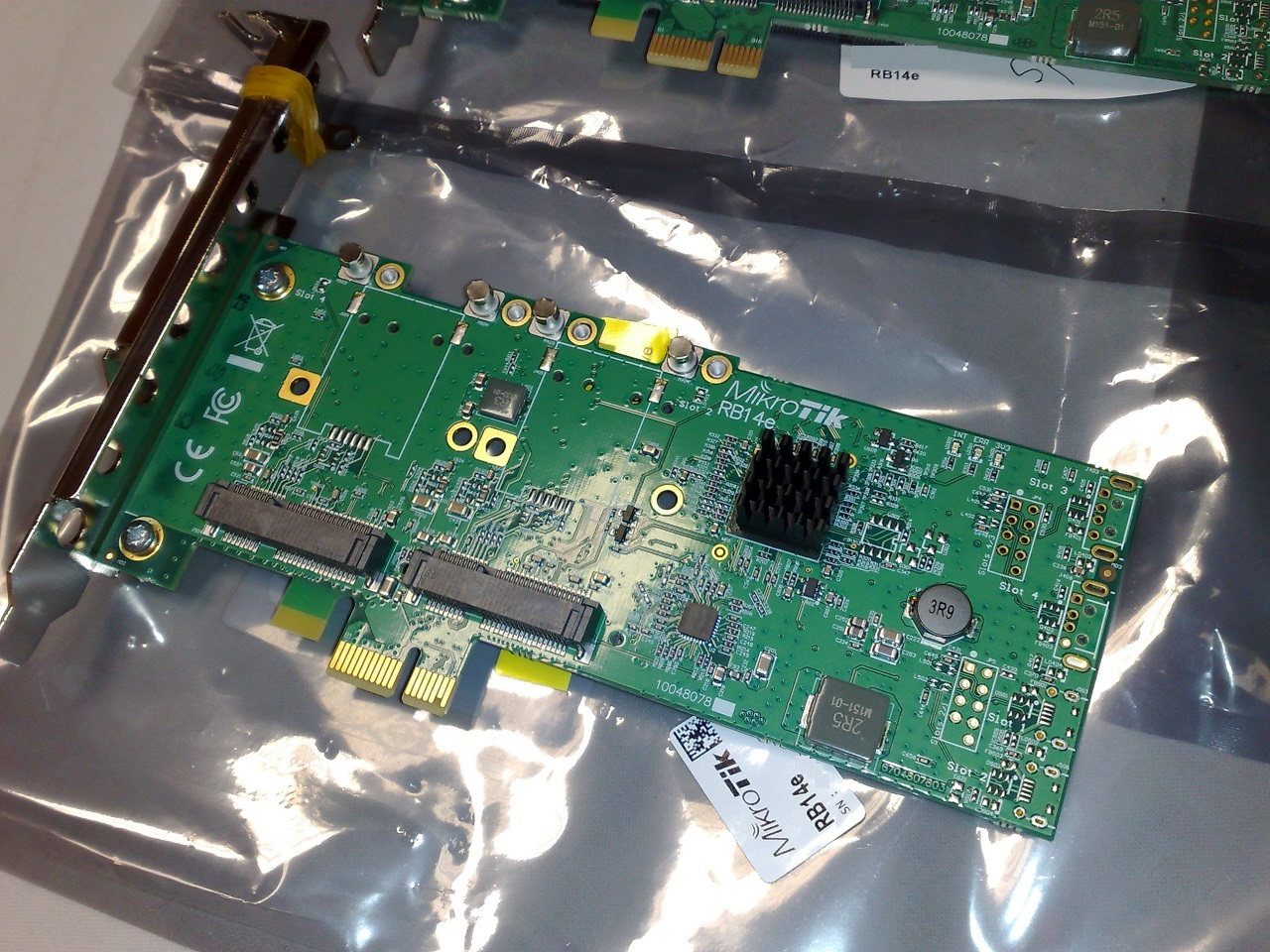
RB14e front view

- All newly manufactured MikroTik products RoHS 2 compliant.
- Release of the SXT Lite5 router, world's most affordable and widely deployed professional 5GHz outdoor CPE.
- Release of the original RB260GS switch, MikroTiK's first SwOS appliance with SFP. The switch chip was the AR8327, the MCU remained the TF470.
- Production of MikroTik switches with data ports slower than gigabit ended.
- First stable RouterOS v6 release, based on Linux 3.3.5, includes 64-bit support, partitions, FastTrack, and FastPath.
- First stable QuickSet release.
- Release of the RB951Ui-2HnD wireless router, MikroTik's most popular appliance under OpenWrt and main workhorse.
- Release of the CRS125-24G-1S-IN, MikroTik's most influential switch ever and first with 128 MiB RAM and low-throughput routing capability.
- Release of the QRT 5 router, MikroTik's first integrated ruggedized hardware.
- Release of the RB14e, world's first multiplexed 4-in-1 adapter card..
- Release of the CRS212-1G-10S-1S+IN, MikroTik's first mostly "copper-free" appliance.

==== 2014 ====
- Release of the CRS226-24G-2S+RM, MikroTik's first switch with SFP+ and 10GbE.
- First stable CAPsMAN release.
- Release of MikroTik's first Wi-Fi 5 devices.
- Release of the NetMetal 5 bridge, MikroTik's first ruggedized device with a miniPCIe slot.
- Release of the RB953GS-5HnT-RP RouterBoard, MikroTik's first dual miniPCIe and 3x3 MIMO device and non-rackmount appliance that was never offered with less than 128 MiB flash.
- Release of the S-RJ01, MikroTik's first copper SFP module.
- Release of the PowerBox, MikroTik's first dedicated outdoor power distribution router.
- Release of the mAP, the world's first professional pocket router, and with microUSB to PoE power passthrough.
- Release of the SXT LTE bridge, MikroTik's first 4G/LTE and integrated cellular appliance.
- Release of MikroTik's first SFP+ Active Optical Cables.
- Release of the cAP 2n, MikroTik's first dedicated ceiling access point.

==== 2015 ====
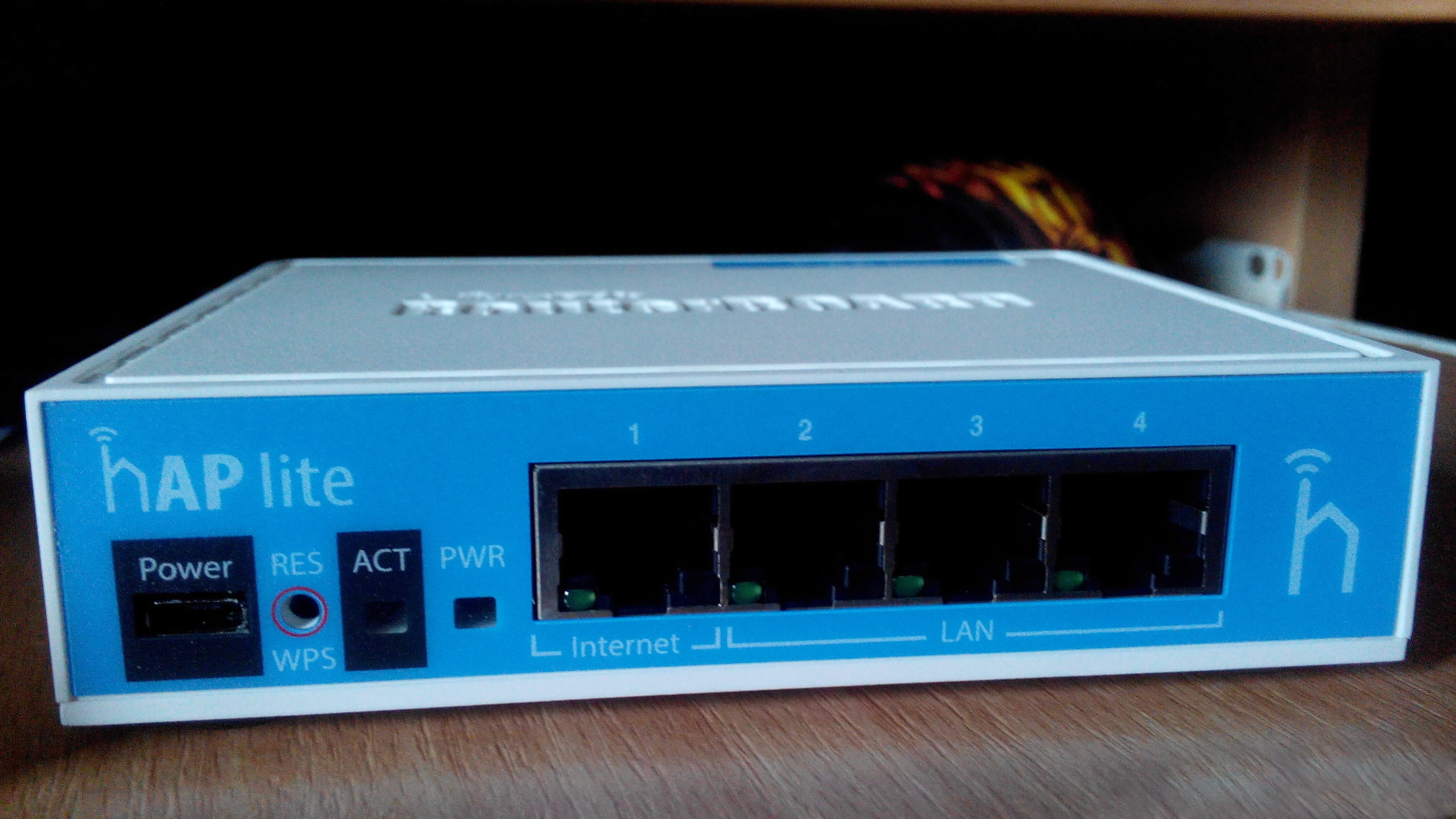
hAP lite dual chain wireless router

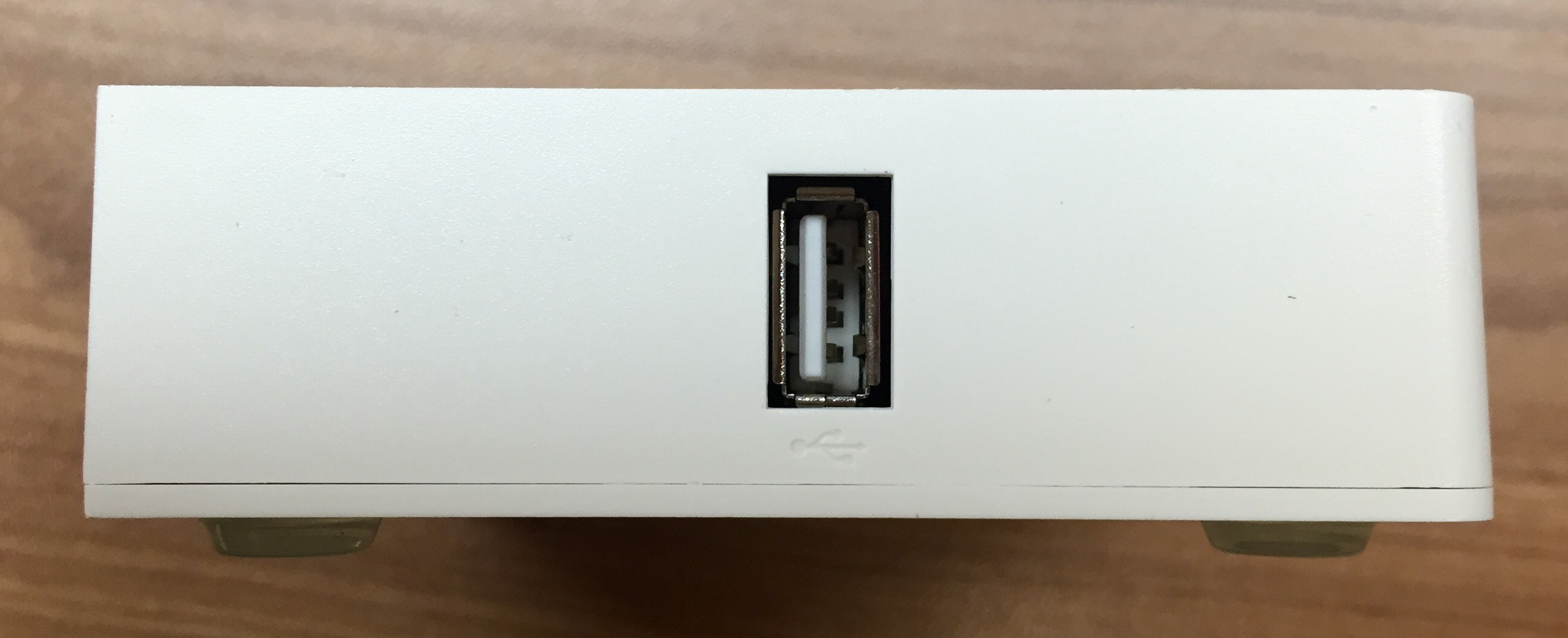
hAP wireless router side USB port

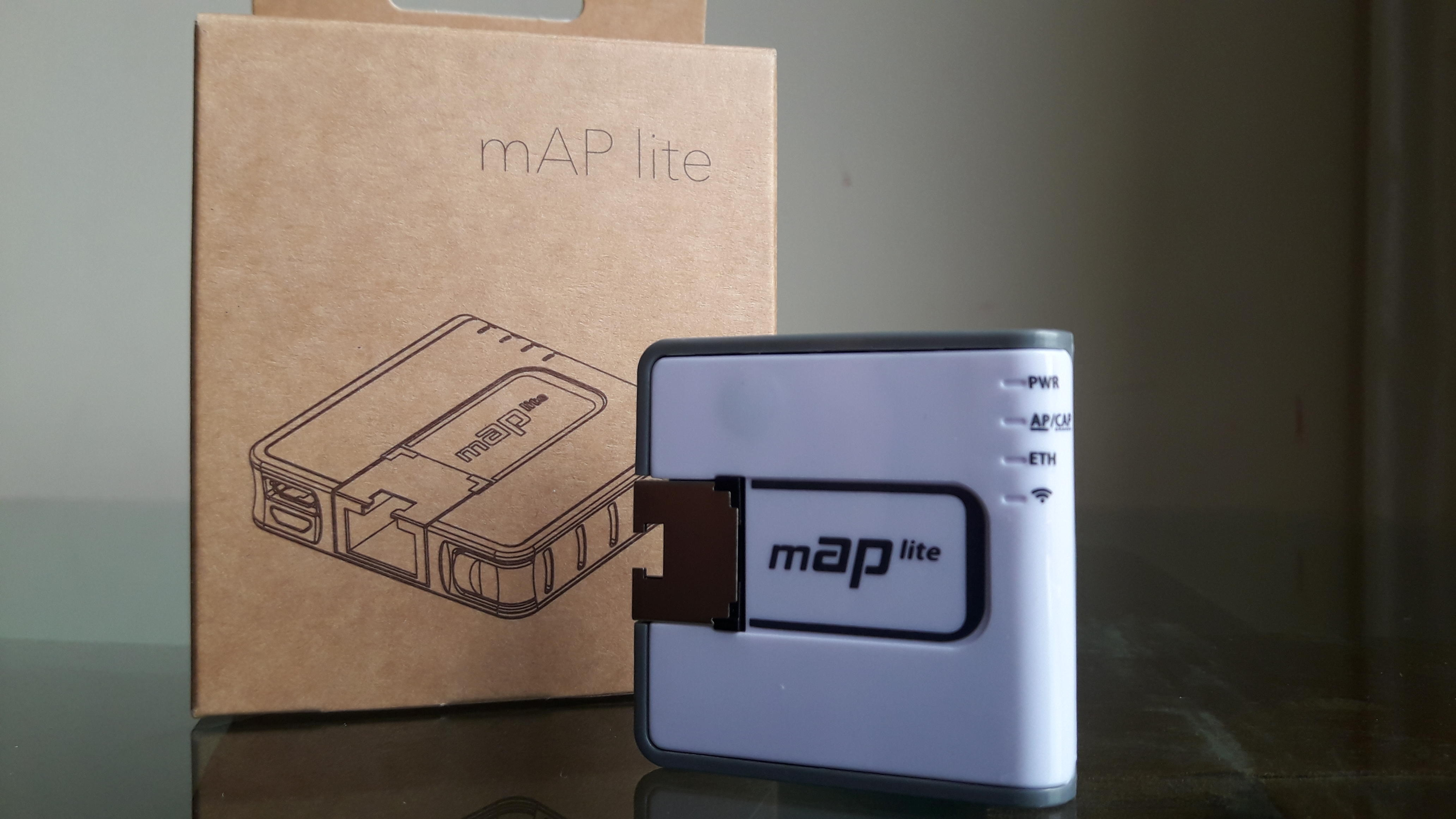
mAP lite dual chain access point

- Release of the hAP lite, world's first $22 professional dual chain wireless router and MikroTik's first SMIPS appliance, and with a multi-function reset button and microUSB for power input (only and dumb) and MikroTik's best selling hardware ever.
- Release of the hAP lite TC, world's most affordable professional router and most affordable and widely deployed 2.4 GHz home router and managed access point.
- Release of the hAP wireless router, MikroTik's first appliance providing up to 1A power output on a USB port.
- Release of the hEX lite, world's most affordable MPLS/VPLS router.
- Release of the wAP, MikroTik's first appliance with bottom+rear entry and offered in 2 color choices and universal access point.
- Release of the cAP, MikroTik's first dual chain ceiling access point.
- Release of the CCR1072-1G-8S+, world's first 72-core router and MikroTik's first M.2 appliance and with more than two 10GbE ports, with ECC RAM as standard, dual removable hot-swap power supply system and aggregate throughput reaching 80 Gbps, more than 120 million packets per second.
- Release of the CCR1009-7G-1C-PC, world's first fanless router capable of 8Gbps throughput and appliance with a logical 2-medium general networking combo port and MikroTik's first fully assembled desktop model never offered with less than 128 MiB flash.
- Tik-App brought in-house.
- Release of MikroTik's first integrated sector routers.
- Release of the mAP lite, the world's smallest access point and MikroTik's most affordable expandable appliance.
- First stable CAPsMAN v2 release.
- Release of the RB3011UiAS-RM, MikroTik's first ARM and USB 3.0 appliance.

==== 2016 ====
- Release of the hAP ac wireless router, world's first triple chain SOHO router with built-in SFP and MikroTik's first fully assembled 6 internal antennas appliance.
- MikroTik's management app released for iOS too.
- Release of the LHG 5 wireless router, world’s first integrated grid antenna with built-in router feed and MikroTik's first grid design appliance.
- Release of the hAP ac lite, world's most affordable dual-band 802.11ac professional router.
- Release of the hEX PoE, world's most affordable 5-port router with SFP and 4x PoE-out and MikroTik's first MMIPS and PoE+ appliance.
- Release of the LDF 5, world's smallest radio to turn any satellite dish into a 10km link.
- Release of the wAP ac, world's most affordable dual-band gigabit weatherproof access point and MikroTik's first slide-out appliance and universal router.
- Release of the hEX, world's most widely deployed professional router and former affordable MPLS/VPLS gigabit and AES-NI router amd that would eventually support VXLAN and MikroTik's first AES-NI SOHO appliance.
- Release of the PowerBox Pro, world's first outdoor gigabit router with built-in 4-port PoE-out and MikroTik's first gigabit and SFP dedicated outdoor power distribution router.
- Release of the FiberBox, world’s first dedicated outdoor 5-port SFP switch and MikroTik's first dedicated outdoor switch, and with SFP and ONLY truly "copper-free" appliance.
- Release of the wAP LTE kit, world’s most affordable professional weatherproof access point with built-in 4G and MikroTik's first device with ignition sensing and integrated cellular access point.

==== 2017 ====
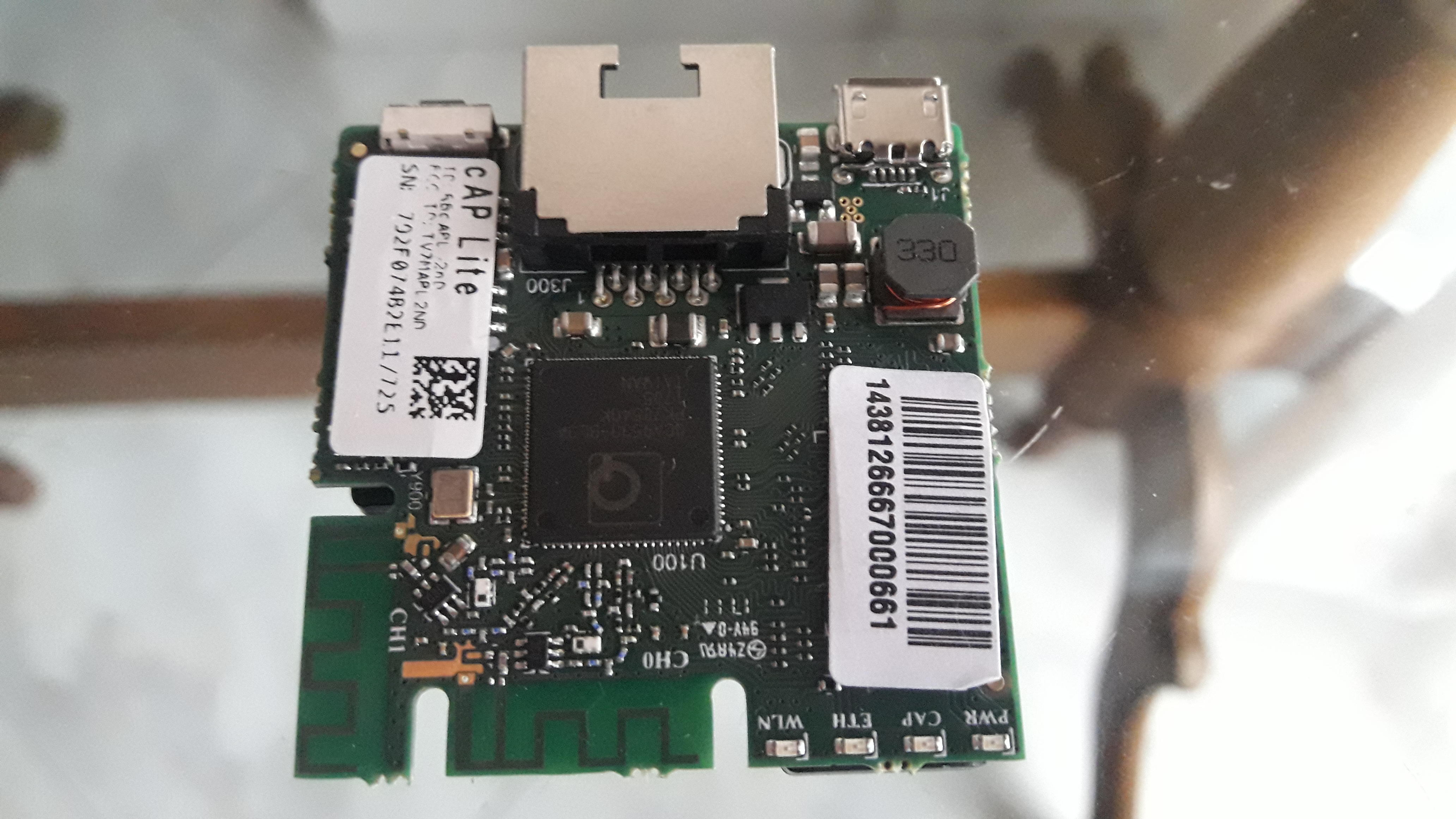
cAP lite board

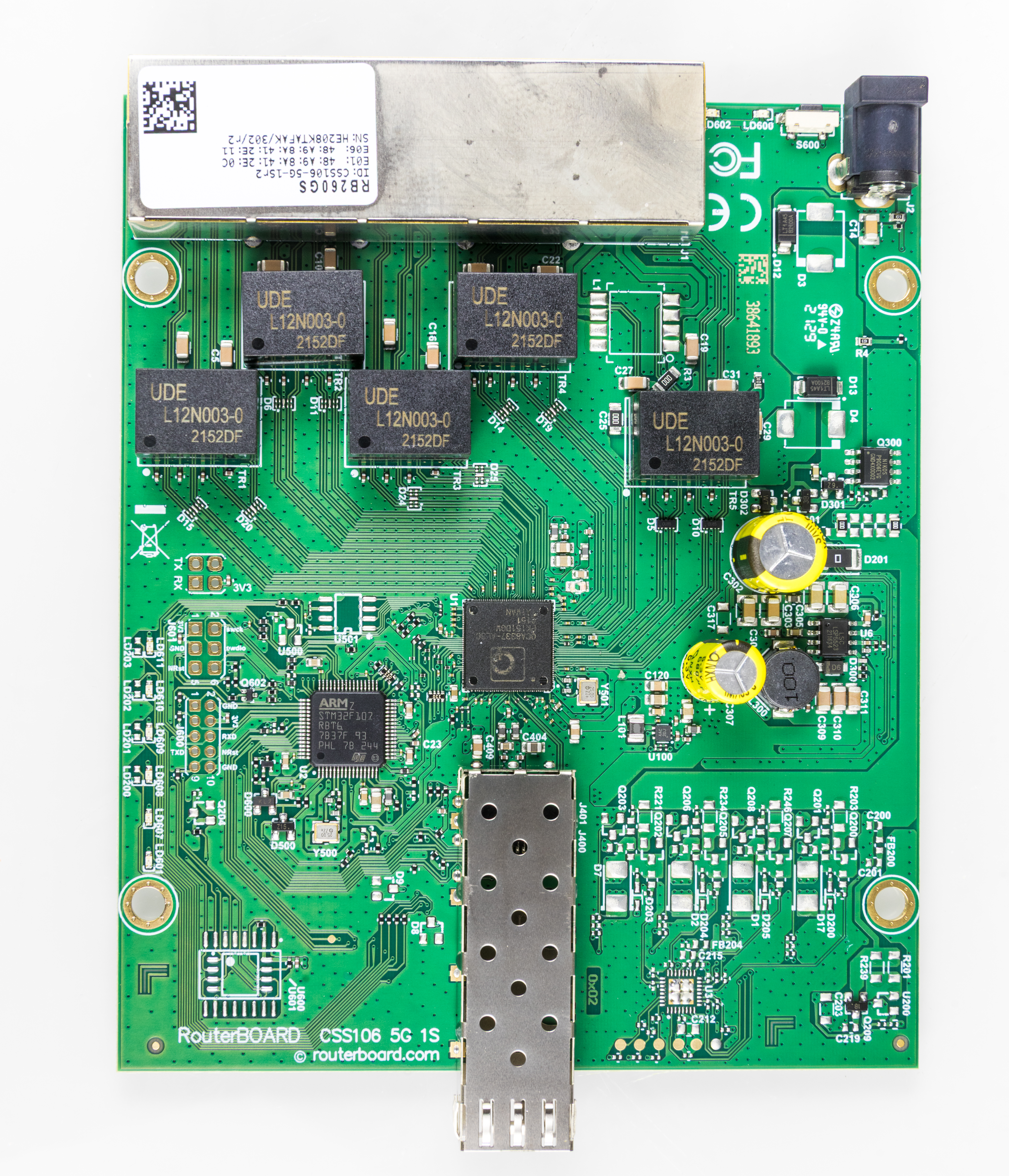
RB260GS (r2): new MCU and switch

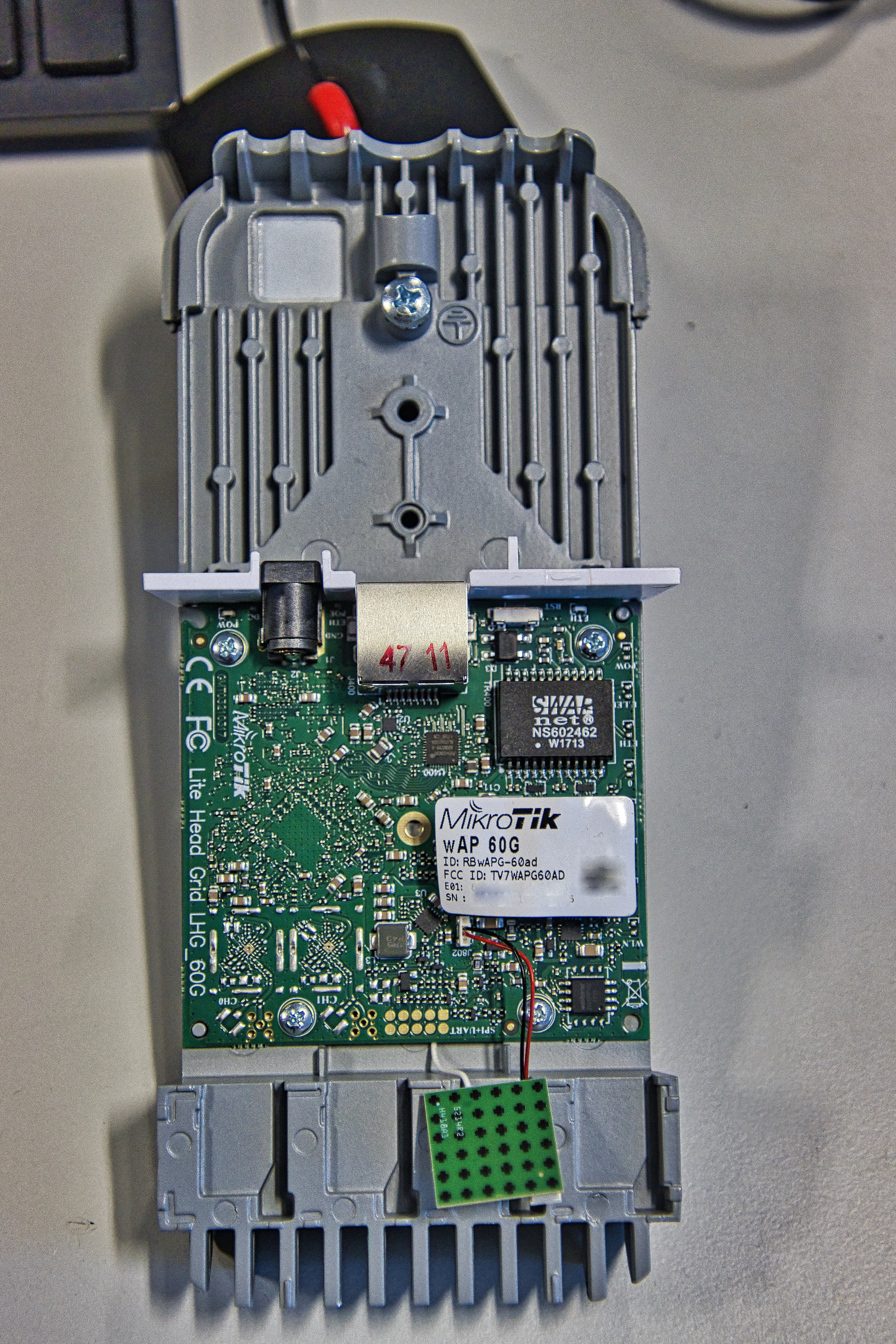
Inside wAP 60G wireless bridge (flipped)

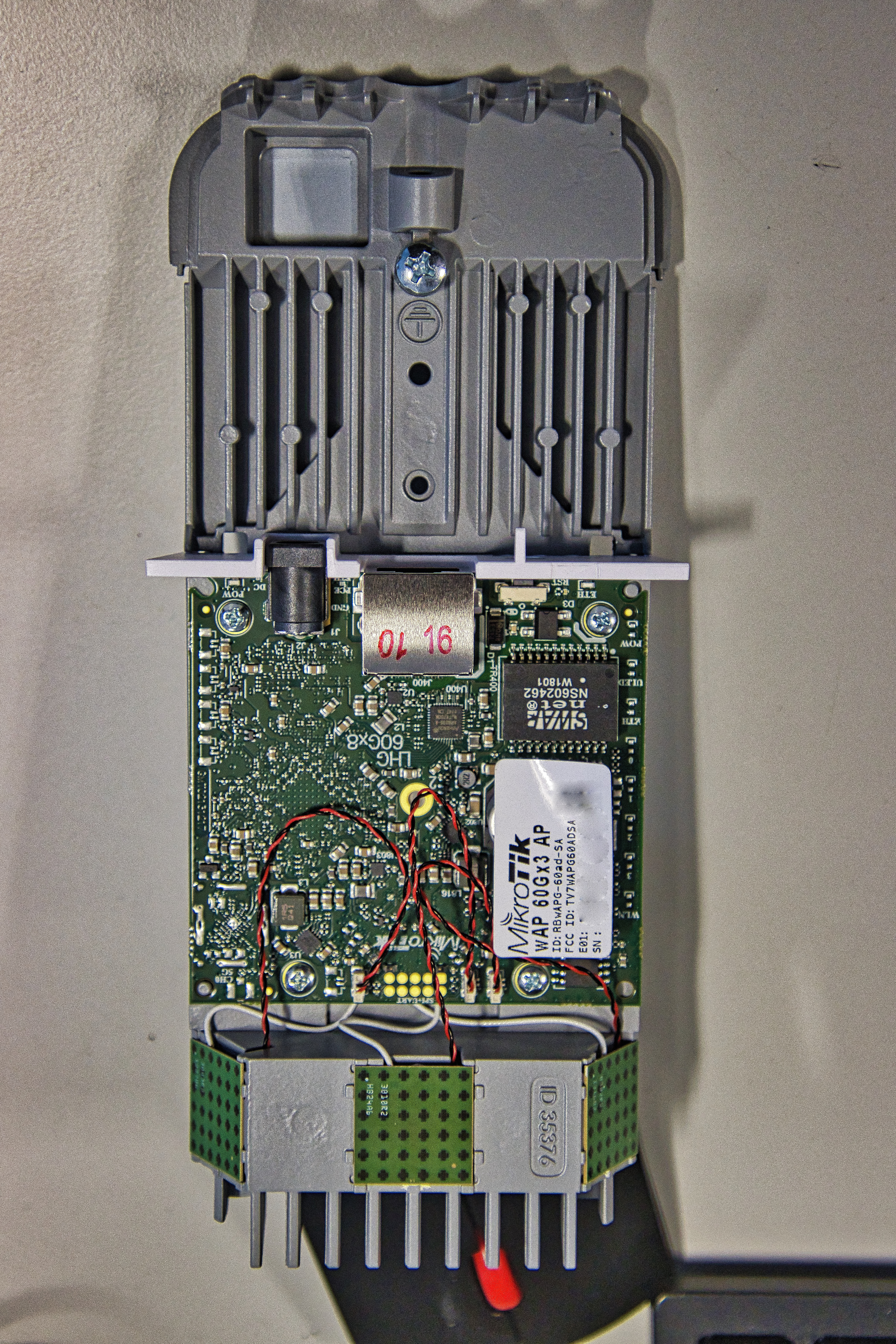
wAP 60Gx3 AP with 3 antenna arrays

- All new RouterOS appliances introduced after the hAP mini have at least 64 MiB RAM.
- Release of the cAP lite, world's first $29 controlled ceiling access point and MikroTik's first appliance to ship with 2 casings and 3D-print design files.
- Release of the CRS326-24G-2S+RM, MikroTik's first switch with a dual-core CPU and 512 MiB RAM and best selling ever and their first appliance capable of booting either SwOS or RouterOS.
- Release of the RB1100AHx4 Dude Edition router, MikroTik's first SATA 3.0, and triple independent storage appliance and quad-core ARM device.
- Release of the wAP 60G wireless bridge, MikroTik's first integrated 60GHz, Active Phased Array Beamforming and 36 antenna elements appliance.
- Release of the CRS317-1G-16S+RM, MikroTik's first switch with GiB RAM and more than two 10GbE ports, over 50 Mbps of real software routing, and dual built-in power supply, and L3 hardware offloading appliance.
- Refresh of the RB260GS, now with an STMicroelectronics ARM Cortex-M3 MCU. The switch chip was upgraded to the QCA8337.
- First stable SwOS v2 release.
- Release of the wAP 60Gx3 AP access point, MikroTik's first 96 antenna elements appliance and integrated 180-degree sector.
- Release of the S+RJ10, MikroTik's first copper SFP+ module.
- Release of the R11e-LTE, MikroTik's first cellular card.

==== 2018 ====
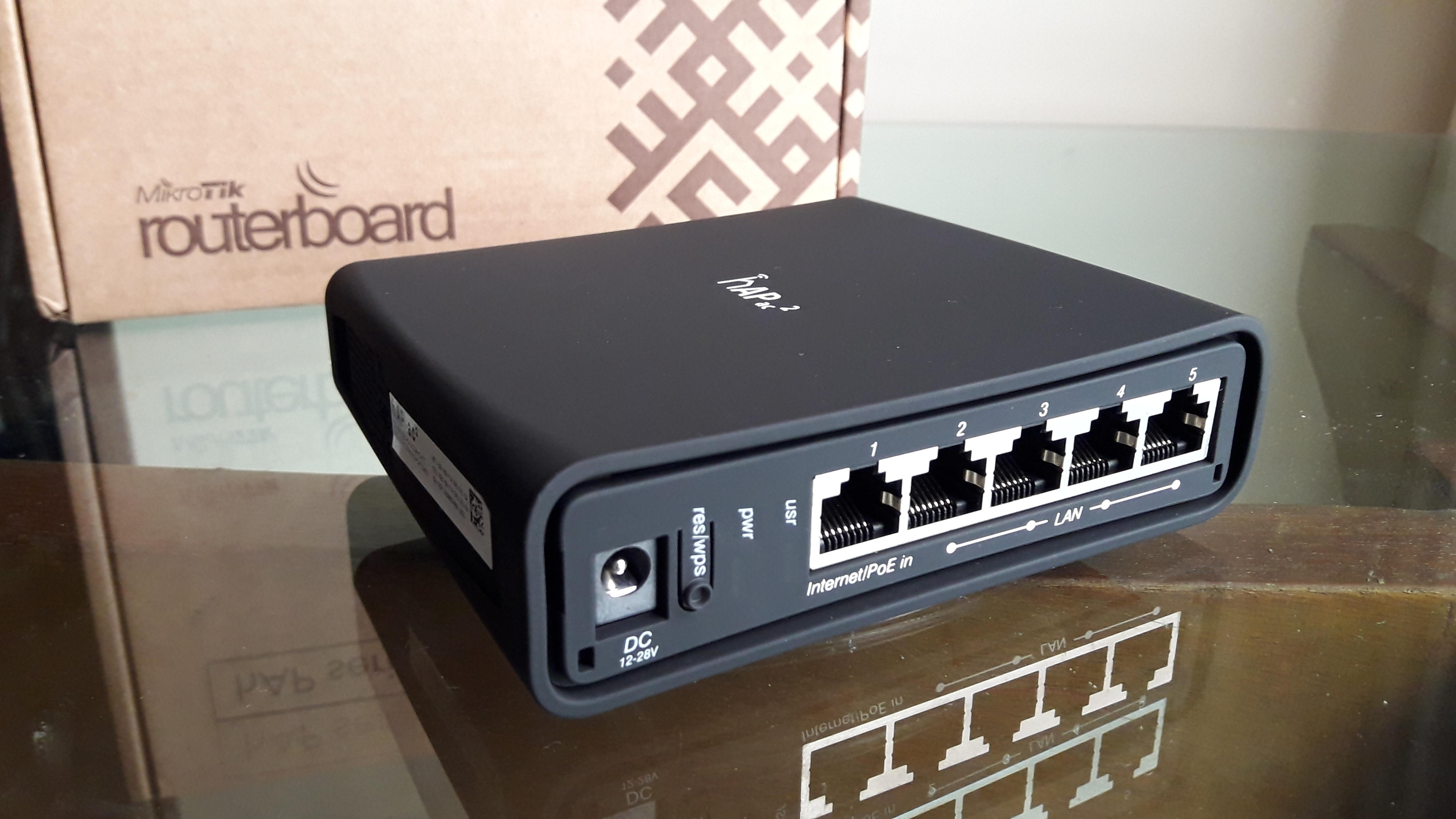
hAP ac² dual-concurrent wireless router

- Release of the LtAP mini access point, MikroTik's first device with a built-in GNSS receiver and IoT product.
- Release of the hAP ac² wireless router, former world's most affordable ARM and still quad core/thread professional router and MikroTik's first fully assembled quad-core ARM SOHO appliance.
- Release of the CRS305-1G-4S+IN, world's most affordable "all"-10GbE managed switch.
- Release of the LHG 60G wireless router, MikroTik's first 60GHz grid design appliance.
- Release of the LHG LTE wireless router kit, MikroTik's first 4G/LTE grid design appliance.
- Long-term RouterOS release channel introduced. First long-term RouterOS v6 release.
- Release of the CRS112-8P-4S-IN switch, MikroTik's first true auto-sensing active PoE+ appliance.

==== 2019 ====
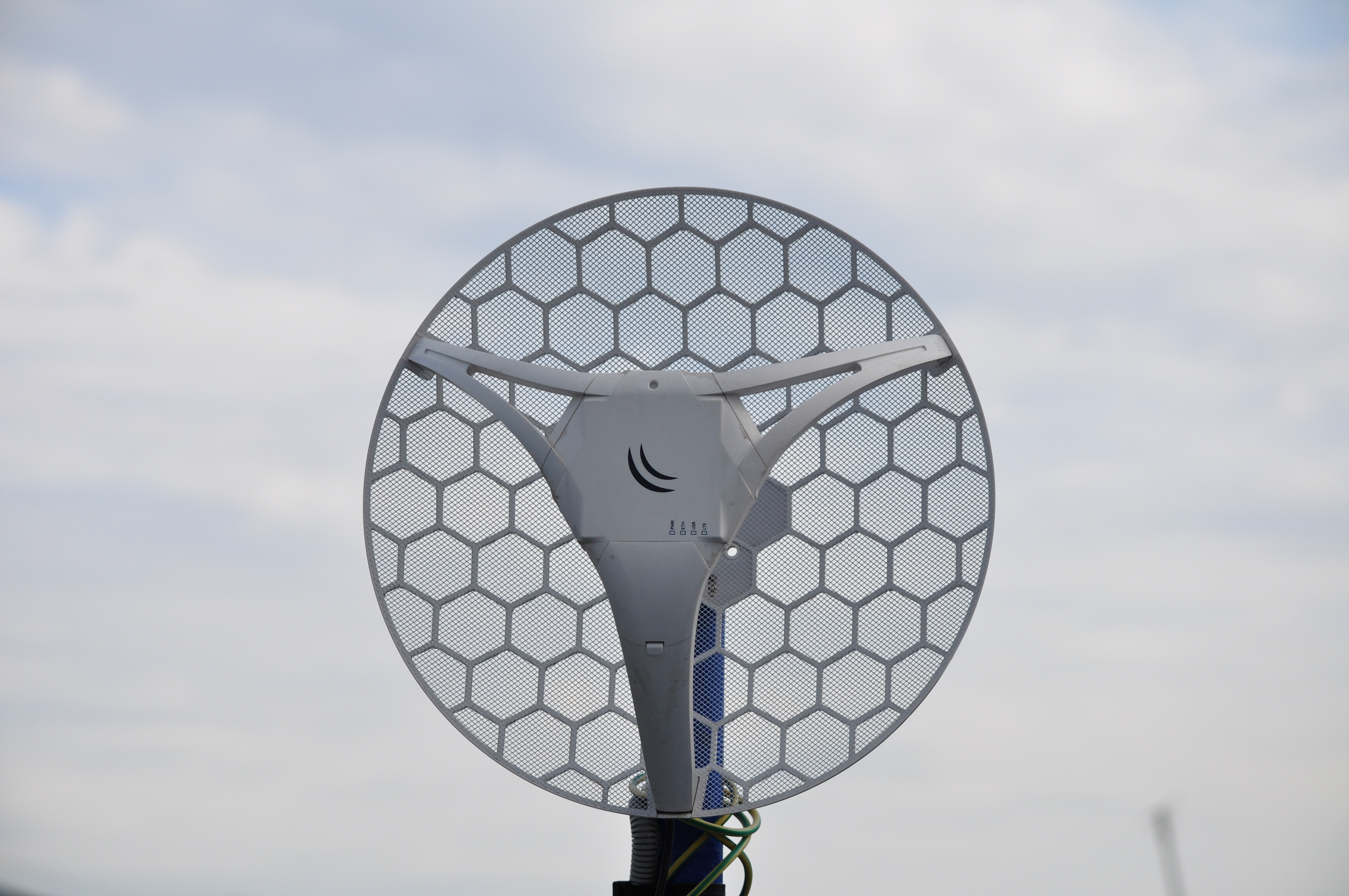
Roof-top directional router LHG LTE6 kit

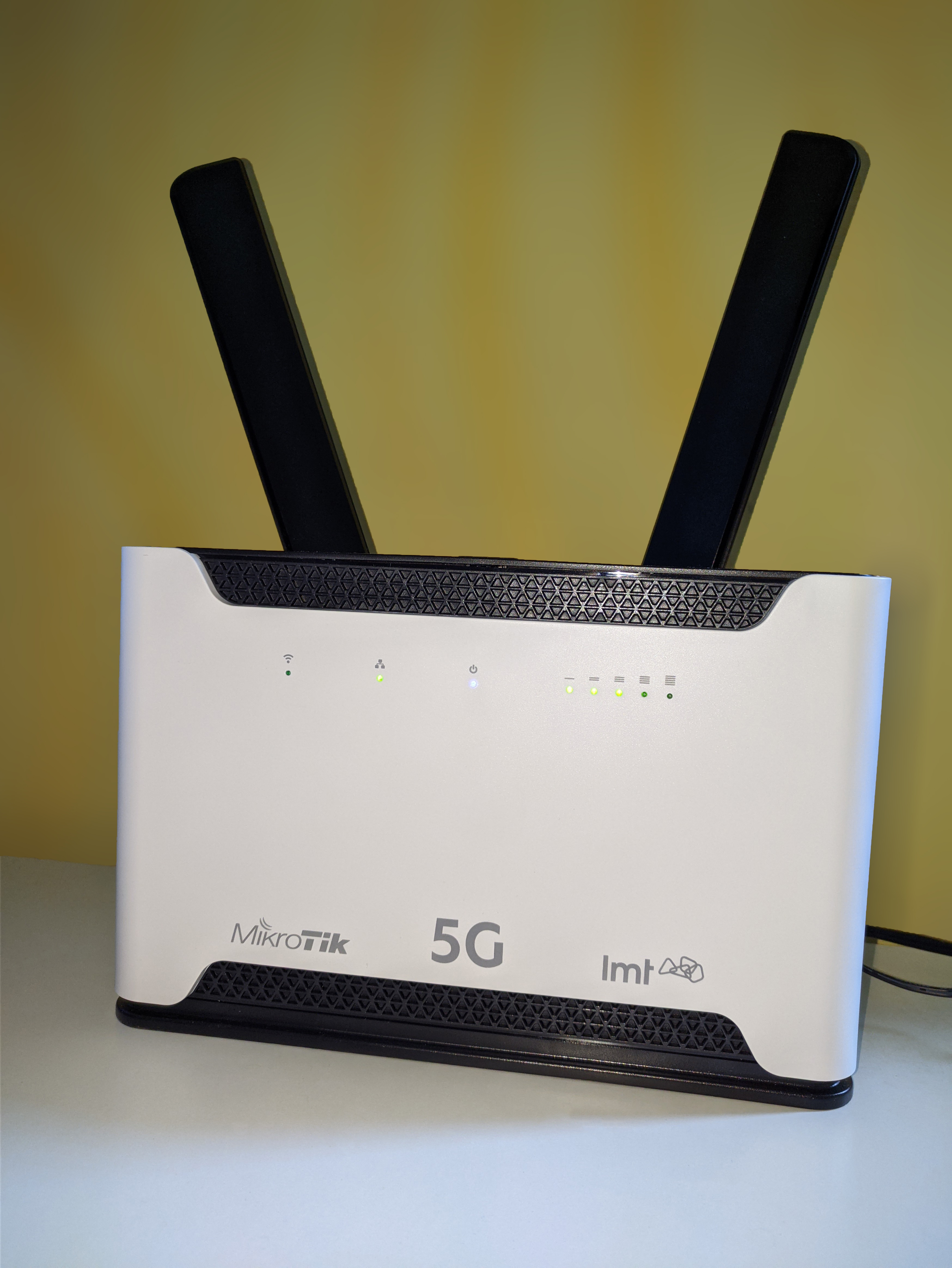
Chateau 5G concurrent wireless router

- All newly manufactured MikroTik products with a microUSB port support PWR-LINE.
- Release of PWR-LINE PLC power bricks, MikroTik's first power line modems.
- First stable RouterOS release supporting PWR-LINE
- Release of the PWR-Line AP, MikroTik's first power line access point.
- Release of MikroTik's first LoRa devices.
- Release of the GPeR, MikroTik's first PoE repeater/extender and own zero configuration device.
- Release of the GPEN11, MikroTik's first reverse power terminal.
- Release of the R11e-LTE6 wireless card, MikroTik's first 2-band carrier aggregation (download) device.
- Release of the LHG LTE6 wireless router kit, MikroTik's first 2-band carrier aggregation (download) grid design appliance.
- First stable wired 802.1X release.
- Release of the CRS312-4C+8XG-RM switch, MikroTik's first 2.5GBASE-T, 5GBASE-T, and 10GBASE-T appliance.
- Release of the CRS326-24S+2Q+RM switch, MikroTik's first QSFP+ and 40GbE appliance.
- Release of MikroTik's first QSFP+ modules.
- Release of MikroTik's first QSFP+ Direct Attach Cables.
- Release of the Q+BC0003-S+, MikroTik's first Breakout Cable.
- Release of the LtAP access point, MikroTik's first triple SIM card and IK-rated product and first ruggedized device with ignition sensing and more than one miniPCIe slot.
- Release of the Audience mesh router, MikroTik's first 4x4 MIMO and dedicated 3-band mesh appliance.
- Release of the PWR-LINE PRO, MikroTik's first 600 Mbps PLC power brick with PoE-out.
- Release of the Chateau 5G wireless router, MikroTik's first 5G appliance.

==== 2020 ====
- Release of the CRS354-48G-4S+2Q+RM switch, first device with more than 28 network ports.
- Release of the CCR2004-1G-12S+2XS, MikroTik's first control plane optimized router with L3 hardware offloading and ARM64, DDR4, SFP28, and 25GbE appliance.
- Release of the netPower 16P, MikroTik's first dedicated outdoor PoE distribution switch, and with 10GbE and SFP+.
- Release of the Chateau LTE12 wireless router, MikroTik's first 4x4 MIMO LTE Category 12, and 3-band carrier aggregation (full) appliance.
- Release of the GPEN21, MikroTik's first managed reverse power terminal, and with an SFP port.
- Release of the CSS610-8G-2S+IN switch, first SwOS Lite appliance.
- Release of the netPower Lite 7R, MikroTik's first reverse PoE switch.
- Release of MikroTik's first SFP28 modules.
- Release of MikroTik's first SFP28 Direct Attach Cables.

==== 2021 ====
- Release of the GPeR IP67 Case, MikroTik's first tool-less and IP68 submersible outdoor housing, and with a universal mounting plate.
- Release of the RB5009UG+S+IN, MikroTik's first 2.5GBASE-T control plane optimized router and ARM Cortex-A72 device.
- Release of the KNOT, MikroTik's first IoT gateway and Bluetooth device.
- Release of the CCR2116-12G-4S+ router, MikroTik's first appliance upgradeable to 128 GiB RAM and ARM device with more than 4 cores (16).
- First stable RouterOS v7 release, based on Linux 5.6.3, with containers, VXLAN, EVPN, WireGuard, ZeroTier, OpenVPN over UDP, Let's Encrypt, and stable VRF. 64-bit also for PCs.
- First stable Beacon Manager release (only for RouterOS v7.1+).

==== 2022 ====
- Release of the CCR2004-1G-2XS-PCIe, world's first standalone router on a standard card and MikroTik's return to PC add-in boards.
- Release of the CCR2004-16G-2S+PC, world's first fanless control plane optimized router with more than one SFP+/10GbE port.
- Release of the CCCR2216-1G-12XS-2XQ, MikroTik's first router with QSFP28, 100GbE and hot-swappable cooling fans.
- Release of MikroTik's first QSFP28 modules.
- Release of MikroTik's first QSFP28 Direct Attach Cables.
- Release of the XQ+BC0003-AS+, MikroTik's first QSFP28 Breakout Cable.
- Release of the CRS504-4XQ-IN, world's first $799 and MikroTik's first QSFP28 and 100GbE switch.
- Release of the CRS518-16XS-2XQ-RM, MikroTik's first switch with 1.2 Tbps capacity, and dual hot-swap modular redundant power supply system and hot-swappable cooling fans.
- Release of the hAP ax² wireless router, MikroTik's first Wi-Fi 6 appliance and the first one to use Bluetooth for mobile app management..
- Release of the Chateau LTE18 ax wireless router, MikroTik's first LTE Category 18, and 4/5-band carrier aggregation (full) appliance.
- Release of the FiberBox Plus, MikroTik's first dedicated outdoor switch with L3 hardware offloading and triple redundant powering.
- Release of the ATL LTE18 wireless router kit, MikroTik's first outdoor 4x4 MIMO LTE Category 18, and 4/5-band carrier aggregation (full) appliance.

==== 2023 ====
- Release of the hAP ax lite, world's most affordable professional Wi-Fi 6 (plus mesh-capable) and MPLS/VPLS/VXLAN/AES-NI gigabit router and MikroTik's first USB-C (dumb power input only) appliance.
- MikroTik SMIPS cellular and expandable appliance production ended. They never made SMIPS switches or outdoor appliances.
- Release of the hAP ax lite LTE6 wireless router, MikroTik's first cellular appliance with USB-C (dumb power input only).
- Release of the CRS310-8G+2S+IN switch, MikroTik's first appliance with more than one 2.5GBASE-T port.
- All new RouterOS appliances introduced after the CRS310 have at least 128 MiB flash and 256 MiB RAM.
- Release of the APA-1 power adapter, MikroTik's first dedicated automotive product and surge protector, and with a gas discharge tube and multi-mode voltage jumper system.
- First stable split CAPsMAN release.

==== 2024 ====
- First stable L3 hardware offloading release (for RouterOS v7.14+).
- Release of the mANTBox ax 15s, world's most affordable Wi-Fi 6 sector access point and MikroTik's first Wi-Fi 6 integrated sector router.
- Release of the CRS520-4XS-16XQ-RM, MikroTik's first switch with real 100+ Mbps software routing capability (725).
- Release of LTM professional sensors, MikroTik's first devices with USB-C for console, management, and dumb emergency power input.
- First stable native Netinstall release for Linux-based operating systems.
- Release of the CRS320-8P-8B-4S+RM switch, world's most affordable L3-offloaded EVPN/VXLAN switch and MikroTik's first PoE++ appliance.
- Release of the CRS304-4XG-IN, world's most affordable "all"-10GBASE-T managed switch and MikroTik's first fanless one with integrated 10GBASE-T.
- Release of the GPeR x4, world's first 4-unit outdoor repeater case and MikroTik's first gigabit hub, dedicated PoE splitter, PoE++ accessory with an integrated case, and own zero configuration multi-port device.
- Release of the hEX refresh, world's first $59 3.6Gbps total routing throughput professional appliance
- Release of the R11e-LTE7 wireless card, MikroTik's first LTE Category 7, Band 28/32 , and full carrier aggregation card.

==== 2025 ====
- First stable RouterOS release featuring device-mode and allowed-versions.
- First stable VXLAN L3 hardware offloading release (for RouterOS v7.18+).
- Release of Rose Data Server (RDS) 2216, marking MikroTik’s first appliance focused on network-attached storage (NAS) and container workloads.
- Release of the CRS418-8P-8G-2S+RM, MikroTiK's first quad-core switch.
- Release of the GPeR x6, MikroTik's first own unmanaged switch, 10GbE SFP+ extender and dedicated 100W PoE++ splitter with triple redundant power.
- First stable BackToHome release.
- First stable BGP-EVPN and ESI Multihoming release (for RouterOS v7.20+).
- Release of the hAP ax S, MikroTik's first 5GHz 3x3 MIMO device.
- Release of the CRS812 DDQ switch, MikroTiK's first QSFP56, QSFP-DD, 50GbE, 200GbE, 400GbE, and MT-HotSwapFan V2 appliance.
- Release of MikroTik's first QSFP56 modules.
- Release of the DQ+BC0003-DS+, MikroTik's first QSFP56 Breakout Cable.
- Release of MikroTik's first QSFP-DD modules.
- Release of the DDQ+DA0001, MikroTik's first QSFP-DD Direct Attach Cable.
- Release of the netPower Lite 8P, world's first outdoor 10GbE switch with Integrated UPS.

==== 2026 ====
- First long-term RouterOS v7 release.
- First stable WinBox release (4.0.1) for all 3 major desktop platforms (Windows, macOS, and Linux).
- Release of the hAP be³ Media, MikroTik's first control plane optimized router with more than one 2.5GBASE-T port and Wi-Fi 7,Thread, Matter, triple USB (including one fully Featured USB-C with Active Gadget Mode), and tool-less slide-out appliance (not supported by v7 LTS yet).

== Products ==
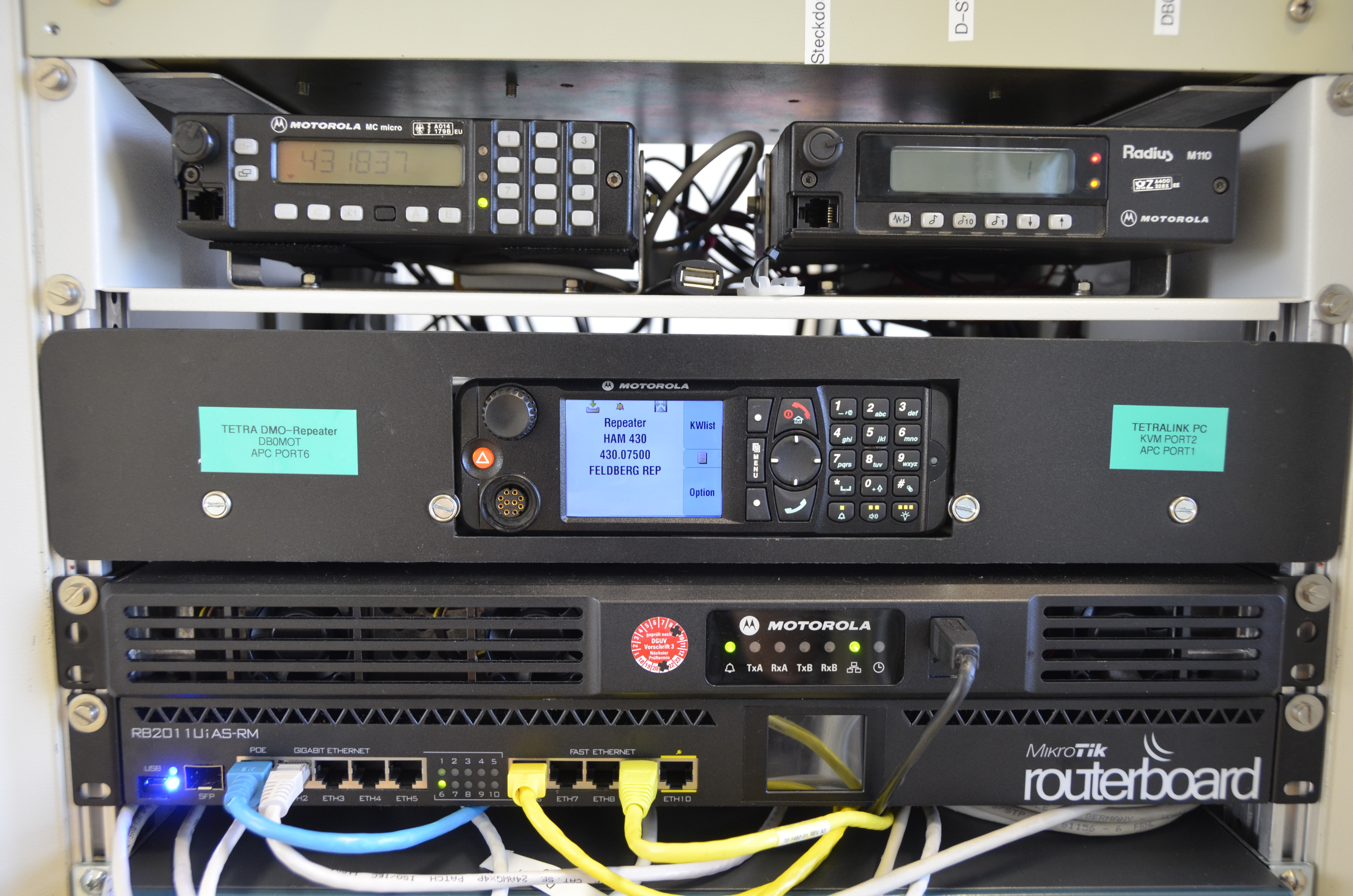
RB2011UiAS-RM in a TETRA rack

MikroTik's products mainly comprise two distinct product lines. The first being the Linux-based MikroTik RouterOS, an operating system for routers and switches. The second is MikroTik RouterBOARD, a line of products that includes various types of Ethernet routers and switches and outdoor wireless systems.

=== RouterOS ===
MikroTik RouterOS is an operating system based on the Linux kernel, specifically designed for routers. It is installed on the company's produced networking hardware - RouterBOARD, as well as on standard x86 type computers, enabling these devices to fulfill router functions. Developed with Internet Service Providers (ISPs) in mind, RouterOS encompasses all the essential features for network management and Internet connectivity, including routing, firewall, bandwidth management, wireless access point functionalities, backhaul link, hotspot gateway, and VPN server capabilities. Communication with this OS is done mainly via WinBox, which provides a graphical user interface with the RouterOS installed on the network router. WinBox facilitates device configuration and monitoring. RouterOS also allows for access via FTP, Telnet, serial console, API, mobile application, SSH, and even direct to MAC address (through WinBox).

RouterOS supports numerous applications utilized by internet service providers, such as OSPF, BGP, and Multiprotocol Label Switching (VPLS/MPLS). It supports both Internet Protocol versions IPv4 and IPv6 and provides support for almost all network interfaces.

=== RouterBOARD ===
The company markets its network hardware under the name RouterBOARD (RB), ensuring full compatibility with the RouterOS operating system. The RouterBOARD line, in conjunction with RouterOS, is sold to small to medium wireless internet service providers, typically offering broadband wireless access in rural and remote areas. The product line includes assembled SOHO routers, indoor and outdoor wireless 802.11 MIMO and TDMA devices, as well as caseless PCB routers for the creation of customized solutions.

==== Wireless antennas ====
MikroTik develops a variety of wireless antennas designed for different use-cases. These include sector antennas, dish antennas, and omni antennas, each offering unique coverage patterns and distance capabilities for outdoor wireless connectivity.

==== Access points ====
MikroTik's access points offer both indoor and outdoor models, with options for different frequency bands and throughput capacities such as 60 GHz wireless systems, 802.11a/b/g/n/ac, 2G, 3G, 4G (LTE) and 5G support.

==== Ethernet routers ====
From small office routers to high-performance routers for ISPs, MikroTik develops solutions for various network sizes and complexities.

==== Network switches ====
Mikrotik also develops switches, including cloud router switches and cloud smart switches. These devices provide numerous ports for network expansion and come with features like VLAN, QoS, and port mirroring.

== Product vulnerabilities ==
=== VPNFilter ===
On 23 May 2018, Cisco Talos Intelligence Group reported that some MikroTik devices were found vulnerable to the VPNFilter malware.

RouterOS through 6.42 allows unauthenticated remote attackers to read arbitrary files and remote authenticated attackers to write arbitrary files due to a directory traversal vulnerability in the WinBox interface.

=== Meris ===
Beginning in June 2021, a botnet composed of unprotected Mikrotik devices created huge volumes of application-layer traffic using HTTP pipelining, resulting in DDOS. The net was named Mēris (or Meris) by Qrator. Yandex reported attacks beginning August 4, 2021 (over 5 million requests per second), peaking on 5 September 2021 with almost 22 million requests per second. Cloudflare acknowledged an attack at over 17 million requests per second in July 2021.

=== FOISted ===
In June 2022, Margin Research disclosed the FOISted vulnerability allowing an administrator on a device to gain "super-admin" access that would permit exploitation of the device for command/control redirection or DDOS attacks. The exploit was patched in the RouterOS version released in October 2022.
