= Carrier aggregation =

Wireless communication technique

In wireless communication, carrier aggregation is a technique used to increase the data rate per user, whereby multiple frequency blocks (called component carriers) are assigned to the same user. The maximum possible data rate per user is increased the more frequency blocks are assigned to a user. The sum data rate of a cell is increased as well because of a better resource utilization. In addition, load balancing is possible with carrier aggregation. Channel selection schemes for CA systems taking into account the optimal values for the training length and power, the number of the probed sub-channels and the feedback threshold such that the sum rate is also important for optimal achievable capacity.

== Types of carrier aggregation ==
Types of carrier aggregation

Depending on the positions of the component carriers three cases of carrier aggregation are distinguished:

- The case where the component carriers are contiguous in the same frequency band is called intra-band contiguous carrier aggregation.
- If the component carriers are in the same frequency band but are separated by a gap the carrier aggregation is called intra-band non-contiguous.
- The most complex case is when the component carriers lie in different frequency band. This is called inter-band carrier aggregation applied to heterogeneous networks.

There is no difference between these three cases from a baseband perspective. However, the complexity from a radio frequency (RF) point of view is increased in the case inter-band carrier aggregation.

== Applications ==
=== UMTS/HSPA+ ===
The channel bandwidth for UMTS/HSPA+ is about 3.8 MHz with a carrier spacing of 5 MHz. Carrier aggregation is also called Dual Cell in the context of UMTS/HSPA+.

Through carrier aggregation (part of the UMTS extension HSPA+) two downlink carriers may be assigned to one user since Release 8. Release 10 supports four-carrier aggregation and eight-carrier-aggregation is supported since Release 11. 3GPP standardized carrier aggregation for HSPA+ for the uplink for up to two component carriers since Release 9.

=== LTE/LTE-Advanced ===
LTE supports since its first release channel bandwidths of 1.4 MHz, 3 MHz, 5 MHz, 10 MHz, 15 MHz and 20 MHz. Since LTE-Advanced Rel. 10 any two channels (of possibly different bandwidths) may be aggregated and be assigned to a single user. A difference between two aggregated 10 MHz component carriers and a single ordinary 20 MHz channel is that in the case of carrier aggregation the control information is transmitted on both component carriers.

LTE Advanced with carrier aggregation allows Gigabit LTE. This is made possible through higher-order modulation (256QAM), carrier aggregation and 4x4 MIMO. Since LTE Release 10 up to 5 component carriers may be aggregated, allowing for transmission bandwidths of up to 100 MHz. Using five aggregated component carriers, MIMO and 256QAM allows theoretical data rates of up to 2 gigabits per second. A management architecture that can aggregate particular systems, networks, and terminals in view of better managing the collection of available resources on a heterogeneous system level, taking into account all systems', networks', and terminals' traffic requirements and technical capabilities is considered for LTE-A system with potential deployment to 5G networks.
