= Italtel =

Italian telecommunications equipment and ICT company founded in 1921

- Type: Limited company
- Industry: Telecommunications
- Founded: 1921
- Headquarters: Milan, Rome, Palermo, Italy
- Key people: Claudio Calabi, President; Carlo Filangieri, CEO
- Products: ICT
- Number of employees: 1,200
- Website: italtel.com

Italtel (since 1981; formerly known by other names) is an Italian multinational ICT company founded in 1921, originally as a branch of Siemens AG.

As of 2024, Italtel's shareholders are Nextalia SGR (54%), Clessidra Capital Credit Fund (28%) and TIM (18%).

The technological areas that Italtel addresses are the evolution of networks and 5G, hybrid cloud, cyber security, tools for agile working, Analytics and Automation applied to networks and services, the Internet of Things in areas such as digital health, manufacturing, smart cities.

Target markets are: Telco & Media, Industry & Manufacturing, Energy & Transport, Banking & Insurance, Healthcare and Public Administration.

Italtel played a major role in the development of telecommunication systems in Italy, most notably as one of the main equipment providers for the Italian state monopoly telephone operator SIP (later Telecom Italia) and as the leading actor in the evolution of the Italian PSTN from analog to digital switching (enabled by Italtel's CT, TN, and UT systems in the 1980s). At its maximum prosperity, the company grew to over 30,000 employees.

In the 1980s–1990s, Italtel experienced a period of crisis and downsizing due to major changes in its reference market (including the abolishment of the state monopoly and the privatization of SIP/Telecom), a situation that was further exacerbated by an unsuccessful merger leveraged buyout at the beginning of the 2000s.

The company then gradually repositioned itself as a player in the international ICT market, focusing on technologies such as IP networks, Next-generation networks, and VoIP, and expanding its customer base to other telecommunication service providers (both national and abroad), public administration, and non-telco companies. In this process, Italtel established a partnership with Cisco Systems (becoming a Cisco Gold Certified Partner) and opened offices in 25 countries worldwide, mostly in Europe and South America. In the early 2000s, Italtel and Cisco played a leading role in another major evolution of the Italian telephone network, namely the creation of a national structure that allowed for most long-range telephone traffic to be transferred from the PSTN to an IP network (implemented by Italtel softswitches and Cisco media gateways).

== History ==
=== 1921–1940s: Company beginnings ===
The origins of Italtel trace back to the Società Italiana Siemens per Impianti Elettrici ("Siemens Italian Company for Electrical Plants"), the Italian branch of German Siemens AG, founded in Milan on 5 December 1898. After World War I, on 21 July 1921, the company name changed to Siemens Società Anonima (Siemens S.A., "Siemens Anonymous Society"), with Giovanni Giamminola as the first CEO. Siemens S.A. is usually considered the first incarnation of Italtel.

By this time, the company was mainly operating as a commercial representative of Siemens in Italy. This gradually changed in the late 1920s, when Siemens began to expand its manufacturing presence in Lombardy and Italy through the acquisition of small manufacturers (most notably Officine Isaria Contatori Elettrici, an electricity meter producer) as well as the establishment of new ones, such as OLAP (Officine Lombarde Apparecchi di Precisione) which produced telephones, pneumatic tubes, radio receivers, and other electrical appliances. In 1942, Isaria, OLAP and other small companies were merged with Siemens S.A. into Siemens Società per Azioni (Siemens S.p.A., "Siemens joint-stock company"), with over 3000 employees.

=== 1948–1970s: Expansion during the economic boom ===
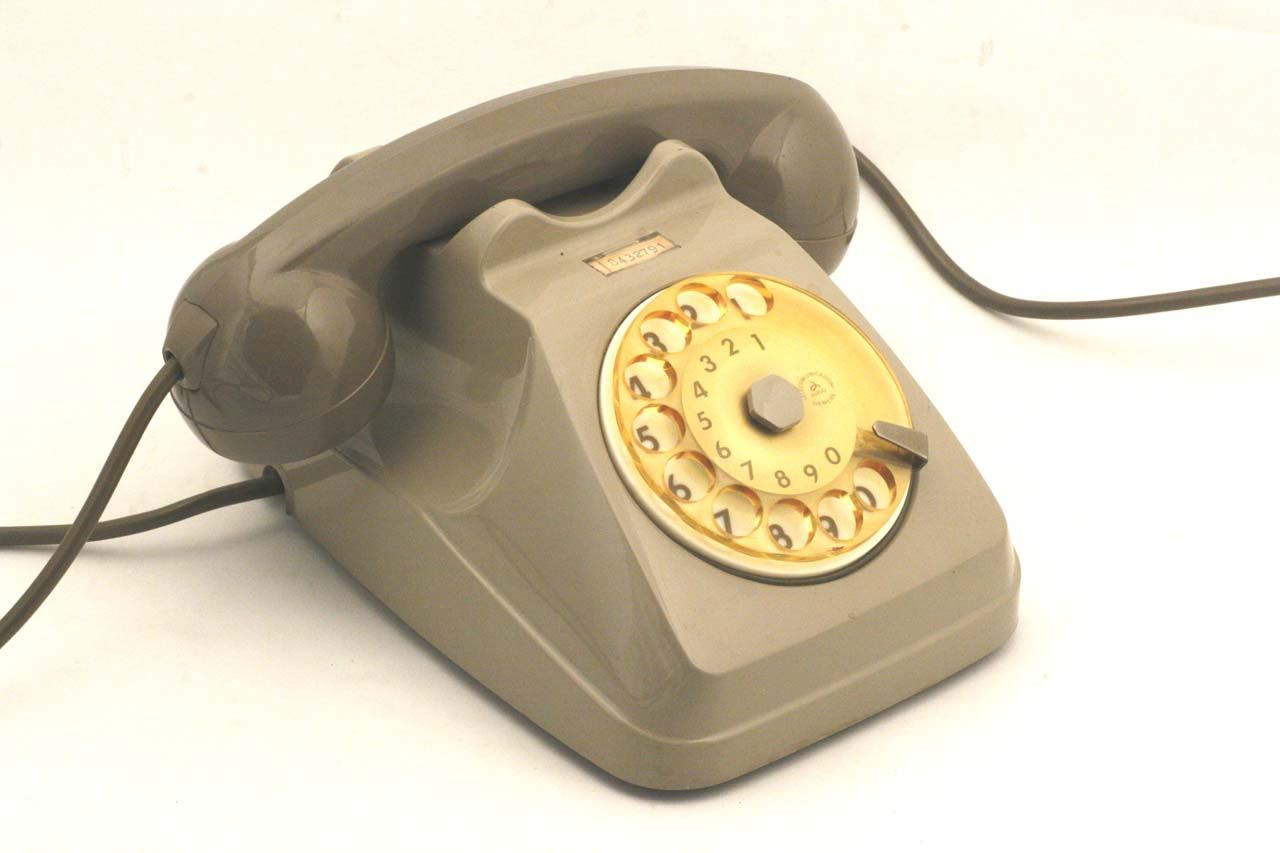
Telephone set "Bigrigio" (Siemens S62), 1960s

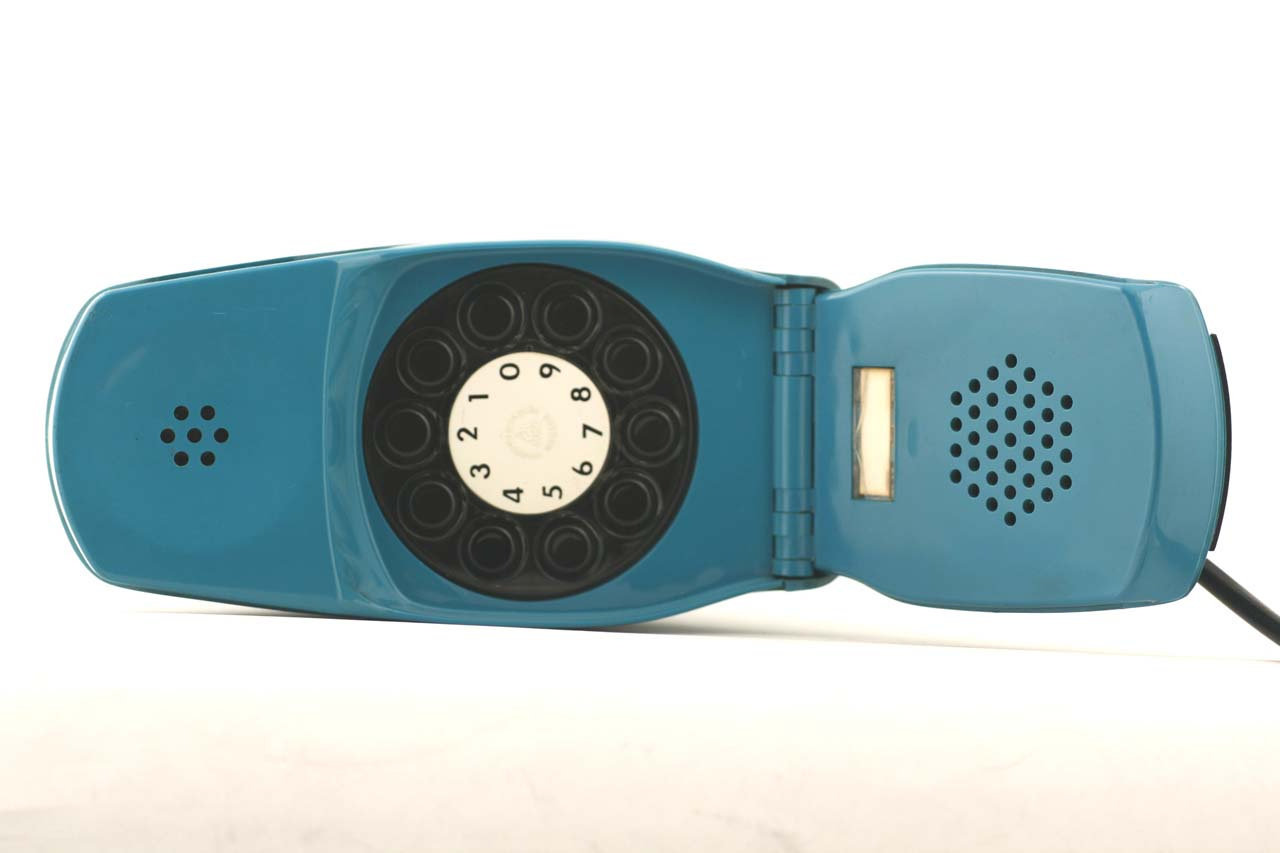
Telephone set "Grillo" (1974), a luxury model designed by Richard Sapper and Marco Zanuso

At the end of World War II, the German-owned Siemens S.p.A. was impounded to the Ministero del Tesoro (Department of the Treasury). Engineer Aganippo Brocchi, who was put in charge of the company in 1948, and managed to bring it back to its pre-war prosperity. In 1950, the company was jointly acquired by SIP and STET, the financial services arm of the IRI (Istituto per la Ricostruzione Industriale, "Institute for Industrial Reconstruction") a public holding company established to support the survival and development of industrial assets in Italy. During the "Italian economic miracle" (1950s-1960s) the leadership of Siemens S.p.A. chose to focus on the booming telecommunications market, and the company changed name to Società Italiana Telecomunicazioni Siemens (SIT-Siemens), with non-telco activities being transferred to the newly established Siemens Elettra. In the same period, new production facilities were established throughout Italy, including Santa Maria Capua Vetere in Campania (for the production of telephone devices), Settimo Milanese (near Milan), L'Aquila, Catania, and Carini (Palermo), and the company grew to about 30,000 employees.

In the 1970s, during the so-called Years of Lead (an era of socio-political turmoil in Italy), Sit-Siemens was involved in several terrorist acts performed by the Red Brigades, including their first kidnapping.

=== 1980s: Leadership of Marisa Bellisario ===
In the early 1980s, SIT-Siemens was the largest telco manufacturing company in Italy, but was also experiencing financial difficulties. In 1981, Marisa Bellisario, formerly head of Olivetti Corporation of America, was chosen as the new CEO. Bellisario was an appreciated, self-made entrepreneur who also had strategic connections to the government (most notably Bettino Craxi, leader of the Italian Socialist Party and Italian Prime Minister in 1983–1987). She changed the name of the company to "Italtel" and actuated a thorough renovation process, which included replacing 70% of the management, costs reduction, and downsizing, and the establishment of several partnerships with other companies, including CIT-Alcatel, Siemens and Apple. Under the leadership of Bellisario, Italtel produced the CT, TN, and UT digital telephone exchanges, which replaced analog with TDM digital switching, allowing for a radical evolution of the Italian PSTN. Italtel exchanges were installed all over Italy. In the same years, Italtel changed from a single company to a corporate group, with Italtel S.p.A. as the leader of the group. Bellisario and Craxi also envisioned merging Italtel with Telettra, another major Italian telco manufacturing company, to form "Telit", a corporation that would supposedly have the potential to face up with the largest telco companies worldwide, however Bellissario died in 1988 and the plan was never implemented.

=== 1990s: Liberalization of the Italian telephone market ===
In 1989, with the sponsorship of Prime Minister Romano Prodi, STET signed for a joint venture between Italtel and AT&T, with 20% of Italtel being acquired by AT&T. This was the conclusion of a long negotiation process which also involved Alcatel, Siemens and Ericsson as potential alternatives to AT&T. The agreement between AT&T and Italtel included a non-compete clause whereby Italtel would maintain its leadership role in the Italian telephone exchange market.

In the early 1990s, the state monopoly on telephony was abolished, and the state-owned operator SIP was turned into a private company, Telecom Italia. At the same time, as a consequence of the privatization of SIP/Telecom, Italtel lost its position as SIP's privileged equipment provider; the alliance between Italtel and AT&T proved to be unsuccessful for both partners, and was canceled in 1994. In 1995, STET initiated a joint venture with Siemens for the control of Italtel through a newly funded company called "Telsi". In this process, Siemens Telecomunicazioni was merged into Italtel. In the late 1990s, Italtel ceded to Siemens all its radio and mobile-related activities, and in turn Siemens sold its 50% share of Telsi to Telecom Italia, which thus ended up owning, either directly or indirectly, 100% if Italtel. All these events severely weakened Italtel, which went through another major restructuring and downsizing process. The company shifted its core business towards voice over IP and network convergence technologies, and was forced to look for new customers, including so-called OLOs (Other Local Operators), foreign markets, public administration, and enterprises. Its number of employees fell to under 20,000.

=== Into the 21st century ===
After this, in 1999, Italtel Tecnoelettrica (design, production and retail of circuits for telecommunications, computers and automation) is given to Lares Cozzi in 1990. The multimedia activities (research, production and fixing of decoders for Stream TV and telephones, maintenance and fixing of the commutation centrals in the structure of Santa Maria Capua Vetere) are sold to Finmek-Access Media; Italtel Systems (project, maintenance and installation of telecommunications systems for Italtel) is sold to a group of companies guided by Tecneudosia. The workforce is reduced to slightly more than 3,200.

Italtel proceeds to acquisitions linked to IP networks and multimedia services. These purchases include One Ans for IT consulting and Securmatics for system security. After 1999 product offering focuses on telephony over IP base with the i-SSW product, at first implemented on a proprietary hardware and on ATCA standard. When the partnership ends in 1999, Italtel S.p.a. becomes 100% owned by Telecom Italia, which in 2000 sells a majority stake to Clayton, Dubilier & Rice and Cisco Systems.

In 2000, Italtel transfers a big part of the voice traffic of the operators on IP network and starts designing, developing and manufacturing products and other solutions for new generation networks and telecommunication services.

On 27 July 2017, Exprivia S.p.A., a company listed on the Milan Stock Exchange (XPR.MI), took over 81% of the company's ordinary share capital after two years of negotiations. The remaining 19% of the capital to Cisco System.[11] The transaction was completed at the end of 2017: from 2018 coordinated budgets and from 2020 the progressive integration of the structures. The brands will be diversified.

In January 2021, in light of the closure of the shareholdings of the outgoing Exprivia and Cisco, a new negotiation began with the PSC S.p.A. group, which in April 2022 became Italtel's controlling shareholder at 54%, in coordination with the TIM Group[1] and the Clessidra Capital Credit Fund. The Board of Directors of the new Italtel appoints Benedetto Di Salvo as CEO and confirms Claudio Calabi as chairman.

In June 2024, the Nextalia SGR fund acquired PSC's stake, becoming Italtel's new majority shareholder. On 13 February 2025, The Board of Directors of the new Italtel appoints Carlo Filangieri as CEO.

== Products ==
Notable products include:

- Siemens S62 (1962): also known as Bigrigio ("Bi-grey", as it originally came in two different shades of grey), S62 was the first desk telephone set to be distributed nationwide by SIP as the default handset for its subscribers. It became the most common set in Italy across the 1960s-1980s.
- Grillo (1960s): a luxury telephone set designed by Marco Zanuso and Richard Sapper, winner of the Compasso d'Oro award for design in 1967.

More recent products include:

- Embrace: Web-Communication solution based on WebRTC
- NetMatch-S: Session Border Controller (SBC) for user–network interface (UNI) and network-to-network interface (NNI)
- i-MCS: Call Control product including principal functions of Core network in NGN and IMS scenery
- i-RPS: Routing and Policy product centralized on IP networks

== Locations ==
Italtel's headquarter is in Milan. Other Italian offices are located in Rome and Palermo. Italtel also works in Europe and Latin America.
