= Bandwidth management =

Capacity control on a communications network

Bandwidth management is the process of measuring and controlling the communications (traffic, packets) on a network link, to avoid filling the link to capacity or overfilling the link, which would result in network congestion and poor performance of the network. Bandwidth is described by bit rate and measured in units of bits per second (bit/s) or bytes per second (B/s).

== Bandwidth management mechanisms and techniques ==
Bandwidth management mechanisms may be used to further engineer performance and includes:

- Traffic shaping (rate limiting):
  - Token bucket
  - Leaky bucket
  - TCP rate control - artificially adjusting TCP window size as well as controlling the rate of ACKs being returned to the sender
- Scheduling algorithms:
  - Weighted fair queuing (WFQ)
  - Class based weighted fair queuing
  - Weighted round robin (WRR)
  - Deficit weighted round robin (DWRR)
  - Hierarchical Fair Service Curve (HFSC)
- Congestion avoidance:
  - RED, WRED - Lessens the possibility of port queue buffer tail-drops and this lowers the likelihood of TCP global synchronization
  - Policing (marking/dropping the packet in excess of the committed traffic rate and burst size)
  - Explicit congestion notification
  - Buffer tuning - allows you to modify the way a router allocates buffers from its available memory, and helps prevent packet drops during a temporary burst of traffic.
- Bandwidth reservation protocols / algorithms
  - Resource reservation protocol (RSVP) - is the means by which applications communicate their requirements to the network in an efficient and robust manner.
  - Constraint-based Routing Label Distribution Protocol (CR-LDP)
  - Top-nodes algorithm
- Traffic classification - categorising traffic according to some policy in order that the above techniques can be applied to each class of traffic differently

== Link performance ==
Issues which may limit the performance of a given link include:

- TCP determines the capacity of a connection by flooding it until packets start being dropped (slow start)
- Queueing in routers results in higher latency and jitter as the network approaches (and occasionally exceeds) capacity
- TCP global synchronization when the network reaches capacity results in waste of bandwidth
- Burstiness of web traffic requires spare bandwidth to rapidly accommodate the bursty traffic
- Lack of widespread support for explicit congestion notification and quality of service management on the Internet
- Internet service providers typically retain control over queue management and quality of service at their end of the link
- Window Shaping allows higher end products to reduce traffic flows, which reduce queue depth and allow more users to share more bandwidth fairly

== Tools and techniques ==
- Packet sniffer is a program or a device that eavesdrops on the network traffic by grabbing information traveling over a network
- Network traffic measurement

== See also ==
- Bandwidth cap
- Bandwidth management is a subset of network management and performance management
- Bandwidth management using NetFlow and IPFIX data
- Bandwidth throttling
- Customer service unit a device to balance the data rate on user's telecommunication equipment
- INASP runs bandwidth management training workshops and produces reports
- Network congestion avoidance lists some techniques for prevention and management of congestion on routers
- Network traffic measurement is a subset of network monitoring
- Traffic shaping and rate limiting are bandwidth management (traffic control) techniques
