= Available bit rate =

Service used in ATM networks

Network architecture	Service model	Guarantee ?				Congestion feedback
Network architecture	Service model	Bandwidth	Loss	Order	Timing	Congestion feedback
Internet	best effort	none	no	no	no	no (inferred via loss)
ATM	CBR	constant rate	yes	yes	yes	no congestion
ATM	VBR	guarantee rate	yes	yes	yes	no congestion
ATM	ABR	guarantee minimum	no	yes	no	yes
ATM	UBR	none	no	yes	no	no

Principle of ABR

Available bit rate (ABR) is a service used in ATM networks when source and destination don't need to be synchronized. ABR does not guarantee against delay or data loss. ABR mechanisms allow the network to allocate the available bandwidth fairly over the present ABR sources. ABR is one of five service categories defined by the ATM Forum for use in an ATM Network.

The network switches use locally available information to determine the explicit allowable rates or relative rate (increase/decrease) for the source. The newly calculated rates are then being sent to the sources using resource management records (RM-cells). RM-cells are generated by the source and travel along the data path to the destination and sent back. ABR sets a minimum cell rate (MCR) and a peak cell rate (PCR). When transfers exceed the PCR, cells are dropped.

Many implementers consider ABR to be overly complex, and its adoption has been modest.

== See also ==
- Traffic contract § Available Bit Rate (ABR)
