= CFosSpeed =

Traffic shaping app

cFosSpeed

- Screenshot of cFosSpeed, version 3.10
- Developer: cFos Software GmbH
- Initial release: 7 July 2004; 21 years ago
- Stable release: 13.10 Build 3005 / 13 March 2026; 2 months ago
- Operating system: Windows 10 and later
- Platform: IA-32 and x86-64
- Type: Traffic shaping
- License: Shareware
- Website: atlas-cfosspeed.com

cFosSpeed is a traffic shaping app for the Windows operating system. It installs a device driver on the network stack to perform stateful packet inspection on the application layer traffic. It has been noted as causing some issues with network connections, and can be difficult to uninstall.

== Operation ==
The app divides Internet traffic into different classes based on program name, protocol (TCP, UDP, or application layer protocols), port numbers, DSCP tags, and other criteria. Outgoing traffic is queued and sent out in order of priority. The app uses TCP flow control to send new data only after older data has been received. It may also throttle data by lowering the TCP window size. Finally, it could act as a packet filter firewall. Users may customize their traffic classifications.

cFosSpeed may cause device driver on Windows 11, but they are easily fixable.

== Distribution ==
cFosSpeed is available as shareware. This app has been bundled with motherboards from MSI, Gigabyte Technology (branded as "Gigabyte Speed"), and ASRock (branded as "XFast LAN"). It has been noted as causing some issues with network connections, and can be difficult to uninstall when bundled.

== Similar Products ==
- NetLimiter
- TrafficShaperXP
