= Intrusion Inc. =

- Type: Public
- Traded as: INTZ
- Industry: Computer and network security
- Founded: 1983
- Founders: T. Joe Head, G. Ward Paxton
- Headquarters: Plano, Texas
- Key people: Tony Scott (CEO)
- Website: https://www.intrusion.com/

Intrusion Inc. (ticker: INTZ) is a cybersecurity company based in Plano, Texas. It provides cybersecurity solutions, including network intrusion detection and prevention systems.

== History ==
Intrusion Inc. was founded in 1983 as Optical Data Systems by G. Ward Paxton Jr. and Joe Head.

=== 1990s ===
In the early 1990s, Optical Data Systems was formed to provide network security products. In 1992, Optical Data Systems (ticker: ODSI) held its initial public offering, raising $17.1 million with a valuation of $99 million.

In the mid-1990s, Intrusion had two business units: the Essential Communications division and the company's LAN division. Products included:

- ODS Infiniti series switches, which supported Ethernet, ATM25, Token Ring and FDDI switching modules
- ODS GSN 6400 switches capable of transferring 6400 megabits per second per port for an aggregate switch bandwidth of 512 gigabits per second

In 1998, ODS Networks acquired Essential Communications Corporation, a producer of switches and Ethernet products.

In 1999, ODS Networks formed Intrusion.com Inc., a wholly owned subsidiary with a focus on the information security business.

=== 2000s ===
On June 1, 2000, the name changed from ODS Networks Inc. to Intrusion.com, Inc., and its ticker symbol from ODSI to INTZ.

On November 1, 2001, the company changed its name again from Intrusion.com, Inc. to Intrusion Inc.

Intrusion announced a $800,000 contract with Fort Hood to deploy Infinity flow-enabled switching products to provide insider threat protection.

=== 2020s ===
In 2020, Jack Blount was appointed CEO and changed the focus toward developing a new network detection and response product named Intrusion Shield.

The company relocated its headquarters from Richardson, Texas to Plano, Texas. Blount resigned as CEO in 2021 amid SEC allegations of false and misleading claims.

In 2021, Tony Scott, a former Chief Information Officer of the United States, was appointed President and CEO of the company.
