= NetLimiter =

Traffic monitoring and firewall software for Windows

- Screenshot Views of NetLimiter
- Developer: Locktime Software s.r.o.
- Initial release: 2005
- Stable release: 5.2.8.0 / July 4, 2023; 2 years ago
- Operating system: Windows XP, Windows Vista, Windows 7, Windows 8, Windows 8.1, Windows 10
- Available in: English, Afrikaans, Chinese (Simplified), Czech, French, German, Hindi, Indonesian, Japanese, Polish, Portuguese (Brazilian), Russian, Slovene, Spanish and Turkish
- Type: Traffic shaping firewall (computing)
- License: Shareware license
- Website: netlimiter.com

NetLimiter is a client-side traffic shaping, monitoring and firewall (computing) software for the Windows operating system. Unlike most traffic-shaping utilities, which are based on centrally managed hardware, NetLimiter is a software-only solution. This has the advantage of being less expensive to deploy, but can result in being more difficult to manage its use across more than one computer.

While it has a significant market among more technically minded computer users, in medium-to-large networks it becomes difficult for administrators to maintain multiple copies of configuration files. It is, however, useful for simulating slow links between departments showing how the applications will work when deployed to slower sites.

It is often lumped together with other free or shareware in articles that present the reader with 'essential' applications and poweruser-type utilities.

== Features and versions ==
The software is available in three versions: the freeware Monitor and two paid for versions, Lite and Pro. Monitor provides real-time monitoring and statistics. Lite provides monitoring and limits, while the Pro version includes all Monitor and Lite features together with additional features including the ability to act as a firewall, remote administration via a webpage, and filtering.

The product has its own programming interface, allowing integration with other software.

Version 1.3 of the software was criticized by cNet in 2009 as using too much memory (12 MB).

Version 3 was released on August 31, 2010.

Version 4.0.13 is a first NetLimiter 4 final release on August 5, 2015.

== Similar products ==
- cFosSpeed
- SeriousBit NetBalancer
- TrafficShaperXP
- Trickle, a Userland Bandwidth Shaper for Unix-like Systems
