= TrafficShaperXP =

Traffic Shaper XP is an obsolete traffic shaping utility for the Windows operating system, which can be used to control the rate at which specific programs upload/download data.

== Criticism ==
The free version of the software only supports a maximum of five rules and ten addresses and limits network traffic to 3,687 kbit/s.

== Similar products ==
- NetLimiter
- cFosSpeed
