= Asynchronous Transfer Mode =

Digital telecommunications protocol for voice, video, and data

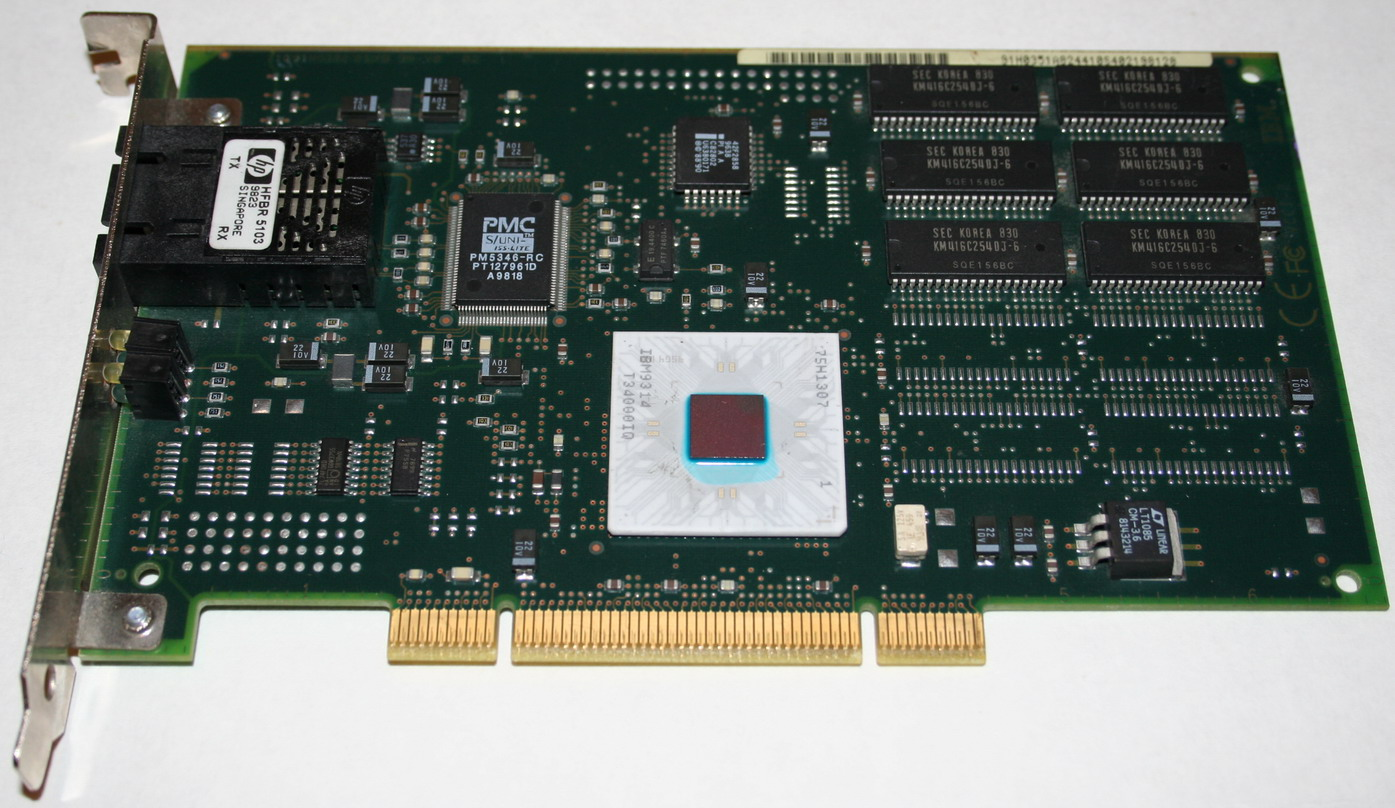
IBM Turboways ATM 155 PCI network interface card

Asynchronous Transfer Mode (ATM) is a telecommunications standard defined by the American National Standards Institute and International Telecommunication Union Telecommunication Standardization Sector (ITU-T, formerly CCITT) for digital transmission of multiple types of traffic. ATM was developed to meet the needs of the Broadband Integrated Services Digital Network as defined in the late 1980s, and designed to integrate telecommunication networks. It can handle both traditional high-throughput data traffic and real-time, low-latency content such as telephony (voice) and video. ATM is a cell switching technology, providing functionality that combines features of circuit switching and packet switching networks by using asynchronous time-division multiplexing. ATM was seen in the 1990s as a competitor to Ethernet and networks carrying IP traffic, as it was faster and, unlike Ethernet, designed with quality-of-service in mind, but it fell out of favor once Ethernet reached speeds of 1 gigabit per second.

In the Open Systems Interconnection (OSI) reference model data link layer (layer 2), the basic transfer units are called frames. In ATM, these frames are of a fixed length (53 octets) called cells. This differs from approaches such as Internet Protocol (IP) (OSI layer 3) or Ethernet (also layer 2) that use variable-sized packets or frames. ATM uses a connection-oriented model in which a virtual circuit must be established between two endpoints before the data exchange begins. These virtual circuits may be either permanent (dedicated connections that are usually preconfigured by the service provider), or switched (set up on a per-call basis using signaling and disconnected when the call is terminated).

The ATM network reference model approximately maps to the three lowest layers of the OSI model: physical layer, data link layer, and network layer. ATM is a core protocol used in the synchronous optical networking and synchronous digital hierarchy (SONET/SDH) backbone of the public switched telephone network and in the Integrated Services Digital Network (ISDN) but has largely been superseded in favor of next-generation networks based on IP technology. Wireless and mobile ATM never established a significant foothold.

== Protocol architecture ==
To minimize queuing delay and packet delay variation (PDV), all ATM cells are the same small size. Reduction of PDV is particularly important when carrying voice traffic, because the conversion of digitized voice into an analog audio signal is an inherently real-time process. The decoder needs an evenly spaced stream of data items.

At the time of the design of ATM, 155 Mbit/s synchronous digital hierarchy with 135 Mbit/s payload was considered a fast optical network link, and many plesiochronous digital hierarchy links in the digital network were considerably slower, ranging from 1.544 to 45 Mbit/s in the US, and 2 to 34 Mbit/s in Europe.

At 155 Mbit/s, a typical full-length 1,500 byte Ethernet frame would take 77.42 μs to transmit. On a lower-speed 1.544 Mbit/s T1 line, the same packet would take up to 7.8 milliseconds. A queuing delay induced by several such data packets might exceed the figure of 7.8 ms several times over. This was considered unacceptable for speech traffic.

The design of ATM aimed for a low-jitter network interface. Cells were introduced to provide short queuing delays while continuing to support datagram traffic. ATM broke up all data packets and voice streams into 48-byte pieces, adding a 5-byte routing header to each one so that they could be reassembled later. Being 1/30th the size reduced cell contention jitter by the same factor of 30.

The choice of 48 bytes was political rather than technical. When the CCITT (now ITU-T) was standardizing ATM, parties from the United States wanted a 64-byte payload because this was felt to be a good compromise between larger payloads optimized for data transmission and shorter payloads optimized for real-time applications like voice. Parties from Europe wanted 32-byte payloads because the small size (4 ms of voice data) would avoid the need for echo cancellation on domestic voice calls. The United States, due to its larger size, already had echo cancellers widely deployed. Most of the European parties eventually came around to the arguments made by the Americans, but France and a few others held out for a shorter cell length.

48 bytes was chosen as a compromise, despite having all the disadvantages of both proposals and the additional inconvenience of not being a power of two in size. 5-byte headers were chosen because it was thought that 10% of the payload was the maximum price to pay for routing information.

=== Cell structure ===
An ATM cell consists of a 5-byte header and a 48-byte payload. ATM defines two different cell formats: user–network interface (UNI) and network–network interface (NNI). Most ATM links use UNI cell format.

Diagram of a UNI ATM cell

7

4
3

0
GFC
VPI

VPI

VCI

VCI

VCI
PT
CLP
HEC

Payload and padding if necessary (48 bytes)

Diagram of an NNI ATM cell

7

4
3

0
VPI

VPI

VCI

VCI

VCI
PT
CLP
HEC

Payload and padding if necessary (48 bytes)

GFC
The generic flow control (GFC) field is a 4-bit field that was originally added to support the connection of ATM networks to shared access networks such as a distributed queue dual bus (DQDB) ring. The GFC field was designed to give the User-Network Interface (UNI) 4 bits in which to negotiate multiplexing and flow control among the cells of various ATM connections. However, the use and exact values of the GFC field have not been standardized, and the field is always set to 0000.
VPI
Virtual path identifier (8 bits UNI, or 12 bits NNI)
VCI
Virtual channel identifier (16 bits)
PT
Payload type (3 bits)

Bit 3 (msbit): Network management cell. If 0, user data cell and the following apply:
Bit 2: Explicit forward congestion indication (EFCI); 1 = network congestion experienced
Bit 1 (lsbit): ATM user-to-user (AAU) bit. Used by AAL5 to indicate packet boundaries.

CLP
Cell loss priority (1-bit)
HEC
Header error control (8-bit CRC, polynomial = X^{8} + X^{2} + X + 1)

ATM uses the PT field to designate various special kinds of cells for operations, administration and management (OAM) purposes, and to delineate packet boundaries in some ATM adaptation layers (AAL). If the most significant bit (MSB) of the PT field is 0, this is a user data cell, and the other two bits are used to indicate network congestion and as a general-purpose header bit available for ATM adaptation layers. If the MSB is 1, this is a management cell, and the other two bits indicate the type: network management segment, network management end-to-end, resource management, and reserved for future use.

Several ATM link protocols use the HEC field to drive a CRC-based framing algorithm, which allows locating the ATM cells with no overhead beyond what is otherwise needed for header protection. The 8-bit CRC is used to correct single-bit header errors and detect multi-bit header errors. When multi-bit header errors are detected, the current and subsequent cells are dropped until a cell with no header errors is found.

A UNI cell reserves the GFC field for a local flow control and sub-multiplexing system between users. This was intended to allow several terminals to share a single network connection in the same way that two ISDN phones can share a single basic rate ISDN connection. All four GFC bits must be zero by default.

The NNI cell format replicates the UNI format almost exactly, except that the 4-bit GFC field is re-allocated to the VPI field, extending the VPI to 12 bits. Thus, a single NNI ATM interconnection is capable of addressing almost 2^{12} VPs of up to almost 2^{16} VCs each. (Note: In practice, some of the VP and VC numbers are reserved.)

=== Service types ===
ATM supports different types of services via AALs. Standardized AALs include AAL1, AAL2, and AAL5, and the rarely used AAL3 and AAL4. AAL1 is used for constant bit rate (CBR) services and circuit emulation. Synchronization is also maintained at AAL1. AAL2 through AAL4 are used for variable bitrate (VBR) services, and AAL5 for data. Which AAL is in use for a given cell is not encoded in the cell. Instead, it is negotiated by or configured at the endpoints on a per-virtual-connection basis.

Following the initial design of ATM, networks have become much faster. A 1500-byte (12000-bit) full-size Ethernet frame takes only 1.2 μs to transmit on a 10 Gbit/s network, reducing the motivation for small cells to reduce jitter due to contention. The increased link speeds by themselves do not eliminate jitter due to queuing.

ATM provides a useful ability to carry multiple logical circuits on a single physical or virtual medium, although other techniques exist, such as Multi-link PPP, Ethernet VLANs, VxLAN, MPLS, and multi-protocol support over SONET.

== Virtual circuits ==
An ATM network must establish a connection before two parties can send cells to each other. This is called a virtual circuit (VC). It can be a permanent virtual circuit (PVC), which is created administratively on the endpoints, or a switched virtual circuit (SVC), which is created as needed by the communicating parties. SVC creation is managed by signaling, in which the requesting party indicates the address of the receiving party, the type of service requested, and whatever traffic parameters may be applicable to the selected service. Call admission is then performed by the network to confirm that the requested resources are available and that a route exists for the connection.

=== Motivation ===
ATM operates as a channel-based transport layer, using VCs. This is encompassed in the concept of the virtual paths (VP) and virtual channels. Every ATM cell has an 8- or 12-bit virtual path identifier (VPI) and 16-bit virtual channel identifier (VCI) pair defined in its header. The VCI, together with the VPI, is used to identify the next destination of a cell as it passes through a series of ATM switches on its way to its destination. The length of the VPI varies according to whether the cell is sent on a user-network interface (at the edge of the network), or if it is sent on a network-network interface (inside the network).

As these cells traverse an ATM network, switching takes place by changing the VPI/VCI values (label swapping). Although the VPI/VCI values are not necessarily consistent from one end of the connection to the other, the concept of a circuit is consistent (unlike IP, where any given packet could get to its destination by a different route than the others). ATM switches use the VPI/VCI fields to identify the virtual channel link (VCL) of the next network that a cell needs to transit on its way to its final destination. The function of the VCI is similar to that of the data link connection identifier (DLCI) in Frame Relay and the logical channel number and logical channel group number in X.25.

Another advantage of the use of virtual circuits comes with the ability to use them as a multiplexing layer, allowing different services (such as voice, Frame Relay, IP). The VPI is useful for reducing the switching table of some virtual circuits that have common paths.

=== Types ===
ATM can build virtual circuits and virtual paths either statically or dynamically. Static circuits (permanent virtual circuits or PVCs) or paths (permanent virtual paths or PVPs) require that the circuit be composed of a series of segments, one for each pair of interfaces through which it passes.

PVPs and PVCs, though conceptually simple, require significant effort in large networks. They also do not support the re-routing of service in the event of a failure. Dynamically built PVPs (soft PVPs or SPVPs) and PVCs (soft PVCs or SPVCs), in contrast, are built by specifying the characteristics of the circuit (the service contract) and the two endpoints.

ATM networks create and remove switched virtual circuits (SVCs) on demand when requested by an end station. One application for SVCs is to carry individual telephone calls when a network of telephone switches is interconnected using ATM. SVCs were also used in attempts to replace local area networks with ATM.

=== Routing ===
Most ATM networks supporting SPVPs, SPVCs, and SVCs use the Private Network-to-Network Interface (PNNI) protocol to share topology information between switches and select a route through a network. PNNI is a link-state routing protocol like OSPF and IS-IS. PNNI also includes a powerful route summarization mechanism to allow construction of very large networks, as well as a call admission control (CAC) algorithm which determines the availability of sufficient bandwidth on a proposed route through a network in order to satisfy the service requirements of a VC or VP.

== Traffic engineering ==
Another key ATM concept involves the traffic contract. When an ATM circuit is set up, each switch on the circuit is informed of the traffic class of the connection. ATM traffic contracts form part of the mechanism by which quality of service (QoS) is ensured. There are four basic types (and several variants), each have a set of parameters describing the connection.

1. CBR – Constant bit rate: a Peak Cell Rate (PCR) is specified, which is constant.
2. VBR – Variable bit rate: an average or Sustainable Cell Rate (SCR) is specified, which can peak at a certain level, a PCR, for a maximum interval before being problematic.
3. ABR – Available bit rate: a minimum guaranteed rate is specified.
4. UBR – Unspecified bit rate: traffic is allocated to all remaining transmission capacity.

VBR has real-time and non-real-time variants, and serves for bursty traffic. Non-real-time is sometimes abbreviated to vbr-nrt. Most traffic classes also introduce the concept of cell-delay variation tolerance (CDVT), which defines the clumping of cells in time.

=== Traffic policing ===
To maintain network performance, networks may apply traffic policing to virtual circuits to limit them to their traffic contracts at the entry points to the network, i.e. the user–network interfaces (UNIs) and network-to-network interfaces (NNIs) using usage/network parameter control (UPC and NPC). The reference model given by the ITU-T and ATM Forum for UPC and NPC is the generic cell rate algorithm (GCRA), which is a version of the leaky bucket algorithm. CBR traffic will normally be policed to a PCR and CDVT alone, whereas VBR traffic will normally be policed using a dual leaky bucket controller to a PCR and CDVT and an SCR and maximum burst size (MBS). The MBS will normally be the packet (SAR-SDU) size for the VBR VC in cells.

If the traffic on a virtual circuit exceeds its traffic contract, as determined by the GCRA, the network can either drop the cells or set the Cell Loss Priority (CLP) bit, allowing the cells to be dropped at a congestion point. Basic policing works on a cell-by-cell basis, but this is sub-optimal for encapsulated packet traffic as discarding a single cell will invalidate a packet's worth of cells. As a result, schemes such as partial packet discard (PPD) and early packet discard (EPD) have been developed to discard a whole packet's cells. This reduces the number of useless cells in the network, saving bandwidth for full packets. EPD and PPD work with AAL5 connections as they use the end-of-packet marker: the ATM user-to-ATM user (AUU) indication bit in the payload-type field of the header, which is set in the last cell of a SAR-SDU.

=== Traffic shaping ===
Traffic shaping usually takes place in the network interface controller (NIC) in user equipment, and attempts to ensure that the cell flow on a VC will meet its traffic contract, i.e., cells will not be dropped or reduced in priority at the UNI. Since the reference model given for traffic policing in the network is the GCRA, this algorithm is normally used for shaping as well, and single and dual leaky bucket implementations may be used as appropriate.

== Reference model ==
The ATM network reference model approximately maps to the three lowest layers of the OSI reference model. It specifies the following layers:

- At the physical network level, ATM specifies a layer that is equivalent to the OSI physical layer.
- The ATM layer 2 roughly corresponds to the OSI data link layer.
- The OSI network layer is implemented as the ATM adaptation layer (AAL).

== Deployment ==
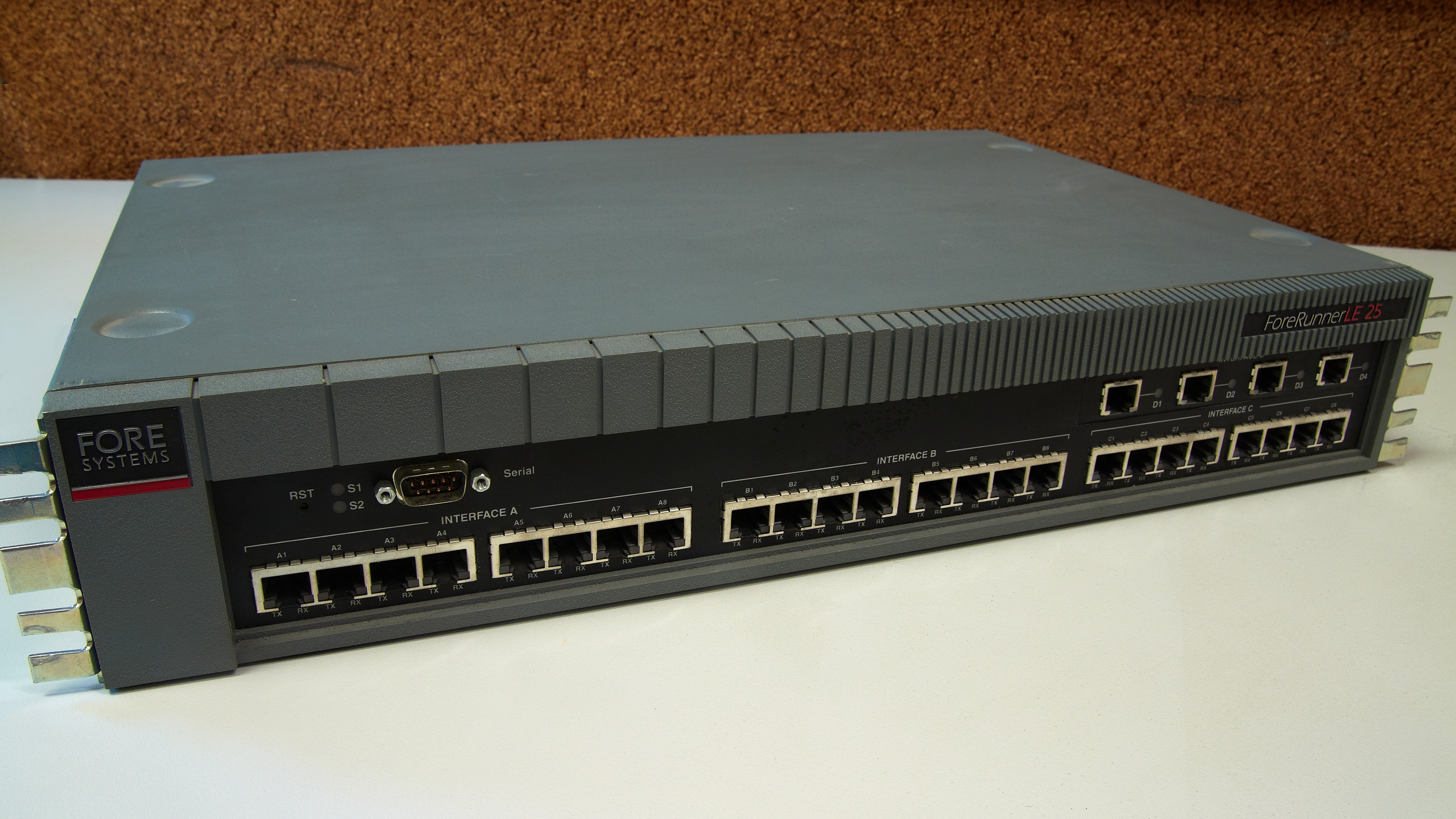
ATM switch by FORE systems

ATM became popular with telephone companies and many computer makers in the 1990s. However, even by the end of the decade, the better price–performance ratio of Internet Protocol-based products was competing with ATM technology for integrating real-time and bursty network traffic. Additionally, among cable companies using ATM there often would be discrete and competing management teams for telephony, video on demand, and broadcast and digital video reception, which adversely impacted efficiency. Companies such as FORE Systems focused on ATM products, while other large vendors such as Cisco Systems provided ATM as an option. After the burst of the dot-com bubble, some still predicted that "ATM is going to dominate". However, in 2005 the ATM Forum, which had been the trade organization promoting the technology, merged with groups promoting other technologies, and eventually became the Broadband Forum.

== Wireless or mobile ATM ==
Wireless ATM, or mobile ATM, consists of an ATM core network with a wireless access network. ATM cells are transmitted from base stations to mobile terminals. Mobility functions are performed at an ATM switch in the core network, known as a crossover switch, which is similar to the mobile switching center of GSM networks.

The advantage of wireless ATM is its high bandwidth and high-speed handoffs done at layer 2. In the early 1990s, Bell Labs and NEC research labs worked actively in this field. Andy Hopper from the University of Cambridge Computer Laboratory also worked in this area. There was a wireless ATM forum formed to standardize the technology behind wireless ATM networks. The forum was supported by several telecommunication companies, including NEC, Fujitsu and AT&T. Mobile ATM aimed to provide high-speed multimedia communications technology, capable of delivering broadband mobile communications beyond that of GSM and WLANs.

== See also ==
- VoATM
- ATM25
