= Customer service unit =

Telecommunications device

In telecommunications, a customer service unit (CSU) is a device that provides an accessing arrangement at a user location to either switched or point-to-point, data-conditioned circuits at a specifically established data signaling rate.

A CSU provides local loop equalization, transient protection, isolation, and central office loop-back testing capability.
