= ATM25 =

Asynchronous Transfer Mode physical layer

ATM25 is an ATM (Asynchronous Transfer Mode) version wherein data is transferred at 25.6 Mbit/s over Category 3 cable.

== Background ==
ATM25 has no particular distinctions from other ATM versions. However, ATM25 chipsets were, at one time, inexpensive in comparison to faster ATM chipsets, having the result of making ATM technology available for small office/home office environments. However, these networks no longer have much potential for expansion, as Ethernet has become the first choice in this domain.

ATM25 chips can typically achieve speeds of around 9 Mbit/s, and typically support around 32 devices in a single loop. ATM25 is still supported today by Cat 6a cables.

The WAN connection side of ATM25 systems often takes place over a fast DSL variant such as RADSL. DSL is often considered in this case, as its technology is based on an ATM core.

== Criticisms ==
In March 2001, Network World described ATM25 as a "solution looking for a problem":
