= Bandwidth throttling =

Intentional slowing of data transmission

Bandwidth throttling is the limitation of the rate of data transfer to or from a network node or network device such as a computer or mobile phone.

The data speed and rendering may be limited depending on various parameters and conditions.

Bandwidth throttling should be done along with rate limiting pattern to minimize the number of throttling errors.

== Overview ==
Limiting the speed of data sent by a data originator (a client computer or a server computer) is much more efficient than limiting the speed in an intermediate network device between client and server because while in the first case usually no network packets are lost, in the second case network packets can be lost / discarded whenever ingoing data speed overcomes the bandwidth limit or the capacity of device and data packets cannot be temporarily stored in a buffer queue (because it is full or it does not exist); the usage of such a buffer queue is to absorb the peaks of incoming data for very short time lapse.

In the second case discarded data packets can be resent by transmitter and received again.

When a low-level network device discards incoming data packets usually can also notify that fact to data transmitter in order to slow down the transmission speed (see also network congestion).

NOTE: Bandwidth throttling should not be confused with rate limiting which operates on client requests at application server level and/or at network management level (i.e. by inspecting protocol data packets). Rate limiting can also help in keeping peaks of data speed under control.

These bandwidth limitations can be implemented:

- at application software level (a client program or a server program, i.e. ftp server, web server, etc.) which can be run and configured to throttle data sent through network or even to throttle data received from network (by reading data at most at a throttled amount per second);
- at network management level (typically done by an ISP).

The first one (client/server program) is usually perfectly legal because it is a choice of the client manager or the server manager (by server administrator) to limit or not to limit the speed of data received from remote program via network or the speed of data sent to target program (server or client).

The second one (ISP) instead is considered an offense in the USA under FCC regulations. While Internet service providers (ISPs) prey on the individual's inability to fight them, fines can range up to $25,000 USD for throttling. In the United States, net neutrality, the principle that ISPs treat all data on the Internet the same, and not discriminate, has been an issue of contention between network users and access providers since the 1990s. With net neutrality, ISPs may not intentionally block, slow down, or charge money for specific online content.

Defined as the intentional slowing or speeding of an internet service by an ISP. It is a reactive measure employed in communication networks to regulate network traffic and minimize bandwidth congestion. Bandwidth throttling can occur at different locations on the network. On a local area network (LAN), a system administrator ("sysadmin") may employ bandwidth throttling to help limit network congestion and server crashes. On a broader level, the ISP may use bandwidth throttling to help reduce a user's usage of bandwidth that is supplied to the local network. Bandwidth throttling is also used as a measurement of data rate on Internet speed test websites.

Throttling can be used to actively limit a user's upload and download rates on programs such as video streaming, BitTorrent protocols and other file sharing applications, as well as even out the usage of the total bandwidth supplied across all users on the network. Bandwidth throttling is also often used in Internet applications, in order to spread a load over a wider network to reduce local network congestion, or over a number of servers to avoid overloading individual ones, and so reduce their risk of the system crashing, and gain additional revenue by giving users an incentive to use more expensive tiered pricing schemes, where bandwidth is not throttled.

== Operation ==
A computer network typically consists of a number of servers, which host data and provide services to clients. The Internet is a good example, in which web servers are used to host websites, providing information to a potentially very large number of client computers. Clients will make requests to servers, which will respond by sending the required data, which may be a song file, a video, and so on, depending on what the client has requested. As there will typically be many clients per server, the data processing demand on a server will generally be considerably greater than on any individual client. And so servers are typically implemented using computers with high data capacity and processing power. The traffic on such a network will vary over time, and there will be periods when client requests will peak or sent responses will be huge, sometimes exceeding the capacity of parts of network and causing congestion, especially in parts of the network that form bottlenecks. This can cause data request failures, or in worst cases, server crashes.

In order to prevent such occurrences, a client / server / system administrator may enable (if available) bandwidth throttling:

- at application software level, to control the speed of ingoing (received) data and/or to control the speed of outgoing (sent) data:
  - a client program could be configured to throttle the sending (upload) of a big file to a server program in order to reserve some network bandwidth for other uses (i.e. for sending emails with attached data, browsing web sites, etc.);
  - a server program (i.e. web server) could throttle its outgoing data to allow more concurrent active client connections without using too much network bandwidth (i.e. using only 90% of available bandwidth in order to keep a reserve for other activities, etc.);

examples: assuming to have a server site with speed access to Internet of 100MB/s (around 1000Mbit/s), assuming that most clients have a 1 MB/s (around 10 Mbit/s) network speed access to Internet and assuming to be able to download huge files (i.e. 1 GB each):
- with bandwidth throttling, a server using a max. output speed of 100kB/s (around 1 Mbit/s) for each TCP connection, could allow at least 1000 active TCP connections (or even 10000 if output is limited to 10 kB/s) (active connections means that data content, such as a big file, is being downloaded from server to client);
- without bandwidth throttling, a server could efficiently serve only 100 active TCP connections (100 MB/s / 1 MB/s) before saturating network bandwidth; a saturated network (i.e. with a bottleneck through an Internet Access Point) could slow down a lot the attempts to establish other new connections or even to force them to fail because of timeouts, etc.; besides this new active connections could not get easily or fastly their proper share of bandwidth.

- at network management level, to control the speed of data received or sent both at low level (data packets) and/or at high level (i.e. by inspecting application protocol data):
  - policies similar or even more sophisticated than those of application software level could be set in low level network devices near Internet access point.

== Application ==
A bandwidth intensive device, such as a server, might limit (throttle) the speed at which it receives or sends data, in order to avoid overloading its processing capacity or to saturate network bandwidth. This can be done both at the local network servers or at the ISP servers. ISPs often employ deep packet inspection (DPI), which is widely available in routers or provided by special DPI equipment. Additionally, today's networking equipment allows ISPs to collect statistics on flow sizes at line speed, which can be used to mark large flows for traffic shaping. Two ISPs, Cox and Comcast, have stated that they engage in this practice, where they limit users' bandwidth by up to 99%. Today most if not all ISPs throttle their users' bandwidth, with or without the user ever even realizing it. In the specific case of Comcast, an equipment vendor called Sandvine developed the network management technology that throttled P2P file transfers.

Those that could have their bandwidth throttled are typically someone who is constantly downloading and uploading torrents, or someone who just watches a lot of online videos. If this is done by an ISP, many consider this practice as an unfair method of regulating the bandwidth because consumers are not getting the required bandwidth even after paying the prices set by the ISPs. By throttling the people who are using so much bandwidth, the ISPs claim to enable their regular users to have a better overall quality of service.

== Network neutrality ==
Net neutrality is the principle that all Internet traffic should be treated equally. It aims to guarantee a level playing field for all websites and Internet technologies. With net neutrality, the network's only job is to move data—not to choose which data to privilege with higher quality, that is faster, service. In the US, on February 26, 2015, the Federal Communications Commission adopted Open Internet rules. They are designed to protect free expression and innovation on the Internet and promote investment in the nation's broadband networks. The Open Internet rules are grounded in the strongest possible legal foundation by relying on multiple sources of authority, including: Title II of the Communications Act and Section 706 of the Telecommunications Act of 1996. The new rules apply to both fixed and mobile broadband services. However, these rules were rolled back on December 14, 2017. On October 19, 2023, the FCC voted 3-2 to approve a Notice of Proposed Rulemaking (NPRM) that seeks comments on a plan to restore net neutrality rules and regulation of ISPs.On April 25, 2024, the FCC voted 3-2 to reinstate net neutrality in the United States by reclassifying the Internet under Title II.

Bright line rules:

- No blocking: broadband providers may not block access to legal content, applications, services, or non-harmful devices.
- No throttling: broadband providers may not impair or degrade lawful Internet traffic on the basis of content, applications, services, or non-harmful devices.
- No paid prioritization: broadband providers may not favor some lawful Internet traffic over other lawful traffic in exchange for consideration or payment of any kind—in other words, no "fast lanes." This rule also bans ISPs from prioritizing content and services of their own affiliated businesses.

== Throttling vs. capping ==
Bandwidth throttling works by limiting (throttling) the speed at which a bandwidth intensive device (a server) receives data or the speed (i.e. bytes or kilobytes per second) of each data response. If these limits are not in place, the device can overload its processing capacity.

Contrary to throttling, in order to use bandwidth when available, but prevent excess, each node in a proactive system should set an outgoing bandwidth cap that appropriately limits the total number of bytes sent per unit time. There are two types of bandwidth capping. A standard cap limits the bitrate or speed of data transfer on a broadband Internet connection. Standard capping is used to prevent individuals from consuming the entire transmission capacity of the medium. A lowered cap reduces an individual user's bandwidth cap as a defensive measure and/or as a punishment for heavy use of the medium's bandwidth. Oftentimes this happens without notifying the user.

The difference is that bandwidth throttling regulates a bandwidth intensive device (such as a server) by limiting how much data that device can receive from each node / client or can output or can send for each response. Bandwidth capping on the other hand limits the total transfer capacity, upstream or downstream, of data over a medium.

== Court cases ==
=== Comcast Corp. v. FCC ===
In 2007, Free Press, Public Knowledge, and the Federal Communications Commission filed a complaint against Comcast's Internet service. Several subscribers claimed that the company was interfering with their use of peer-to-peer networking applications. The Commission stated that it had jurisdiction over Comcast's network management practices and that it could resolve the dispute through negotiation rather than through rulemaking. The Commission believed that Comcast had "significantly impeded consumers' ability to access the content and use the applications of their choice", and that because Comcast "ha[d] several available options it could use to manage network traffic without discriminating" against peer-to-peer communications, its method of bandwidth management "contravene[d] ... federal policy". At this time, "Comcast had already agreed to adopt a new system for managing bandwidth demand, the Commission simply ordered it to make a set of disclosures describing the details of its new approach and the company's progress toward implementing it". Comcast complied with this Order but petitioned for a review and presented several objections.

== ISP bandwidth throttling ==
=== Canada ===
In 2008, the Canadian Radio-television and Telecommunications Commission (CRTC) decided to allow Bell Canada to single out peer-to-peer (P2P) traffic for bandwidth throttling between the hours of 4:30 p.m. to 2 a.m. In 2009, the CRTC released a guideline for bandwidth throttling rules.

In 2011, following a major complaint by the Canadian Gamers Organization against Rogers for breaking the 2009 rules already in place, the CRTC created an addendum to their Internet Traffic Management Practices (ITMP) policy, allowing them to send the complaint to their Enforcements Division. The Canadian Gamers Organization in their submissions alluded to filing a complaint against Bell Canada. On December 20, 2011, Bell Canada announced they would end throttling by March 31, 2012 for their customers, as well as their wholesale customers. On February 4, 2012, in an effort to get out of trouble with the CRTC (which had continued its own testing and had found additional non-compliance and demanded immediate compliance), Rogers announced 50% of their customers would be throttle-free by June 2012, and 100% of their customers would be throttle-free by the end of 2012. Unfortunately for Rogers, this did not mollify the CRTC Enforcements Division.

ISPs in Canada that throttle bandwidth:

- Acanac: No
- Altima telecom: No
- Bell Canada: No
- Cogeco Cable: No
- DeryTelecom: Yes (Netflix)
- Distributel: Yes
- Bell MTS: No (Only with unlimited data mobile devices)
- Oxio: No
- Rogers Cable: Yes (Netflix) (Android)
- SaskTel: Yes
- Primus Telecom: No
- Shaw: Yes (25% of the traffic)
- Xplornet: Yes, and also prioritizes VoIP
- TELUS: Yes(2% of the traffic)
- EastLink: Yes – The public statement was "Confidential".
- Sunwire Cable: No
- Sunwire DSL: No
- Teksavvy Cable: No
- Teksavvy DSL: No
- Teksavvy DSL MLPPP: No
- Talk Wireless Inc.: Yes
- Internet Lightspeed Cable: No
- Internet Lightspeed DSL: No
- Internet Lightspeed Bonded (MLPPP): No

=== Europe ===
In April 2011, the European Union launched an investigation into ISPs' methods for managing traffic on their networks. Some ISPs, for instance, restrict access to services such as Skype or the BBC iPlayer at peak times so that their users all receive an equal service. The EU's commissioner for the digital agenda, Neelie Kroes, said: "I am absolutely determined that everyone in the EU should have the chance to enjoy the benefits of an open and lawful Internet, without hidden restrictions or slower speeds than they have been promised." The Body of European Regulators for Electronic Communications (Berec) will examine the issues for the EU, and will ask both businesses and consumers for their views. The EU published the results of its investigation at the end of 2011. New laws mean that ISPs are prohibited from blocking or slowing down of Internet traffic, except where necessary.

=== Singapore ===
In Singapore, net neutrality has been the law since 2011. November 2010, defined by the Infocomm Development Authority (IDA). But despite the law, the majority of the ISPs do throttle bandwidth.

ISPs in Singapore that throttle bandwidth:

ISP Name	Limits bandwidth
Starhub	Yes
Singtel	Yes
M1 Limited	Yes
MyRepublic	No
Viewqwest	No

=== United States ===
In 2007, Comcast was caught interfering with peer-to-peer traffic. Specifically, it falsified packets of data that fooled users and their peer-to-peer programs into thinking they were transferring files. Comcast initially denied that it interfered with its subscribers' uploads, but later admitted it. The FCC held a hearing and concluded that Comcast violated the principles of the Internet Policy Statement because Comcast's "discriminatory and arbitrary practice unduly squelched the dynamic benefits of an open and accessible Internet and did not constitute reasonable network management." The FCC also provided clear guidelines to any ISP wishing to engage in reasonable network management. The FCC suggested ways that Comcast could have achieved its goal of stopping network congestion, including capping the average user's capacity and charging the most aggressive users overage (going over a maximum) fees, throttling back the connections of all high capacity users, or negotiating directly with the application providers and developing new technologies.

However, in 2008, Comcast amended their Acceptable Usage Policy and placed a specific 250 GB monthly cap. Comcast has also announced a new bandwidth-throttling plan. The scheme includes a two-class system of "priority-best-effort" and "best-effort" where "sustained use of 70% of your up or downstream throughput triggers the BE state, at which point you'll find your traffic priority lowered until your usage drops to 50% of your provisioned upstream or downstream bandwidth for "a period of approximately 15 minutes". A throttled Comcast user being placed in a BE state "may or may not result in the user's traffic being delayed or, in extreme cases, dropped before PBE traffic is dropped". Comcast explained to the FCC that "If there is no congestion, packets from a user in a BE state should have little trouble getting on the bus when they arrive at the bus stop. If, on the other hand, there is congestion in a particular instance, the bus may become filled by packets in a PBE state before any BE packets can get on. In that situation, the BE packets would have to wait for the next bus that is not filled by PBE packets".

US cell phone ISPs have also increasingly resorted to bandwidth throttling in their networks. Verizon and AT&T even applied such throttling to data plans advertised as "unlimited", resulting an FCC complaint against Verizon. Though AT&T had told its customers throttling was a possibility, the FTC filed a lawsuit against the company in 2014, charging that the disclosure was insufficiently specific. A nation-wide study of video streaming speeds in 2018-2019 found major wireless carriers throttling a majority of the time, including when traffic was light, and with significant discrepancies between video services.

=== Uruguay ===
Antel has a state-enforced monopoly forcing consumers who require non-wireless Internet access (i.e. ADSL or fiber – cable Internet is outlawed) to purchase it directly from Antel. Its practices provide insight into the probable behavior of ISPs in markets that have little or no competition and/or lack balancing regulations in the interest of consumers. All of Antel's Internet access plans for consumers are either capped or throttled. Capped plans are typically marketed under the brand "flexible". On such plans once a user reaches a data tier (e.g. 5 GB) additional data usage is billed at a rate of approximately $5 US/GB. Once a second tier is reached (e.g., 15 GB), Internet services are suspended until the start of the next billing cycle. Throttled plans are typically marketed under the brand "Flat Rate" (for ADSL) and "Vera" (for fiber.) Such plans allow full bandwidth on the connection (e.g. 20 Mbit/s down on the Vera fiber plan) from the beginning of the billing month but are restricted to a percentage of the contracted transmission rate (e.g., to 2 Mbit/s down, or 10% of the advertised speed) once a data tier (e.g. 150 GB) is reached. Full bandwidth capability is restored at the beginning of the next billing month.

== Metrics for ISPs ==
Whether aimed at avoiding network congestion or at pushing users to upgrade to costlier Internet plans, the increasingly common capping and throttling practices of ISPs undoubtedly have an effect on the value proposition of the plans they offer. For consumers to be able to make an informed decision when choosing an Internet plan, ISPs should publish their capping and throttling practices with the necessary level of detail. While the net effect of some throttling and capping strategies can be hard to compare across ISPs, some basic metrics that are of interest for any kind of throttled/capped Internet connection are:

- Maximum monthly payload: This is the amount of data that an Internet connection would be able to carry in a hypothetical setting assuming no bottlenecks external to the ISP. In the example Antel 20Mbs fiber connection (see Uruguay above), the maximum monthly payload in that hypothetical setting would be reached by running the connection at 20Mbs for the first 150 GB, and at 2Mbs for the rest of the month. Thus the maximum monthly payload of that connection is 60,000 seconds * 2.5 MB/s + 2,532,000 seconds * 0.25 MB/s = 783 GB (about the size of a large laptop disk drive in 2013.)
- Maximum utilization percentage: This is the ratio of the maximum monthly payload of a throttled Internet connection to the maximum unthrottled monthly payload of the same connection. In the example Antel fiber 20Mbs connection the maximum unthrottled monthly payload of that connection is 2,592,000 seconds * 2.5 MB/s = 6,480 GB. Thus the maximum utilization percentage of that connection is 783 GB / 6,480 GB = 12%
- Throttling percentage: This represents how much the maximum monthly payload of an Internet connection gets reduced by the ISP's throttling policy. It is calculated simply as 1 − maximum utilization percentage. In the example Antel fiber 20Mbs connection it is 1 − 12% = 88%
- Equivalent connection bandwidth: This is the bandwidth of an unthrottled Internet connection whose maximum monthly payload is the same as the maximum monthly payload of the throttled connection in question. This can be calculated as unthrottled connection bandwidth * throttling percentage. In the example Antel fiber 20Mbs connection the equivalent connection bandwidth is 20 Mbs * 12% = 2.4 Mbs
- Cost per unit payload: The ultimate metric of throttling's effect on an Internet connection's potential value to a customer is the cost per GB (or TB in the case of fast connections) carried assuming perfect utilization of the connection. It is calculated by dividing the monthly cost of the connection by the maximum monthly payload. In the example Antel fiber 20 Mbs connection it would be US$36 / 0.783 TB = US$46 per TB. By comparison, if the same 20Mbs connection weren't throttled by the ISP it would have a cost per unit payload of US$36 / 6.48 TB = US$5.6 per TB
- Unthrottled connection cost: This is how much it would cost the customer to offset the effect of throttling by aggregating throttled Internet connections from the ISP. It is calculated by dividing the monthly cost of a throttled connection by the throttling percentage. In the example Antel fiber connection the cost of building an unthrottled 20 Mbit/s fiber Internet connection by aggregating 20 Mbit/s throttled ones would be US$36 / 12% = US$300 per month

== User responses ==
Although ISPs may actively throttle bandwidth, if the throttling is focused on a particular protocol, there are several methods to bypass the throttling (although some of these methods may be against the ToS of specific plans).

- Virtual private network (VPN) – Generally costs a monthly fee to rent, but offers users a secure connection where data cannot be intercepted.
- Force Encryption – Free method that works for some users.
- Seedbox – A dedicated private server, usually hosted offshore, that offers high-speed upstream and downstream rates and often storage for a relatively high monthly cost.
- SSH Tunneling – Tunneling protocol

== See also ==
- Traffic shaping
- Bandwidth management
- Rate limiting
