= Call admission control =

Call admission control (CAC) is a form of admission control that prevents or mitigates oversubscription of VoIP networks. CAC is used in the call set-up phase and applies to real-time media traffic as opposed to data traffic. CAC mechanisms complement and are distinct from the capabilities of quality of service tools to protect voice traffic from the negative effects of other voice traffic and to keep excess voice traffic off the network. Since it averts voice traffic congestion, it is a preventive Congestion Control Procedure. It ensures that there is enough bandwidth for authorized flows.

Integrated services with RSVP (which reserve resources for the flow of packets through the network) using controlled-load service ensures that a call cannot be set up if it cannot be supported. CAC rejects calls when either there is insufficient CPU processing power, the upstream and downstream traffic exceeds prespecified thresholds, or the number of calls being handled exceeds a specified limit.

CAC can be used to prevent congestion in connection-oriented protocols such as ATM. In that context, there are several schemes available. However, VoIP differs in that it uses RTP, UDP and IP, all of which are connectionless protocols.
