= Network-to-network interface =

Interface that specifies signaling and management functions between two networks

In telecommunications, a network-to-network interface (NNI) is an interface that specifies signaling and management functions between two networks. An NNI circuit can be used for interconnection of signalling (e.g., SS7), Internet Protocol (IP) (e.g., MPLS) or ATM networks.

In networks based on MPLS or GMPLS, NNI is used for the interconnection of core provider routers (class 4 or higher).

In the case of GMPLS, the type of interconnection can vary across Back-to-Back, EBGP or mixed NNI connection scenarios, depending on the type of VRF exchange used for interconnection. In case of Back-to-Back, VRF is necessary to create VLANs and subsequently sub-interfaces (VLAN headers and DLCI headers for Ethernet and Frame Relay network packets) on each interface used for the NNI circuit. In the case of eBGP NNI interconnection, IP routers are taught how to dynamically exchange VRF records without VLAN creation.

NNI also can be used for interconnection of two VoIP nodes. In cases of mixed or full-mesh scenarios, other NNI types are possible.

NNI interconnection is encapsulation independent, but Ethernet and Frame Relay are commonly used.

== See also ==
- User–network interface
- Asynchronous Transfer Mode
