= User–network interface =

In telecommunications, a user–network interface (UNI) is a demarcation point between the responsibility of the service provider and the responsibility of the subscriber. This is distinct from a network-to-network interface (NNI), which defines a similar interface between provider networks.

== Specifications defining a UNI ==
=== Metro Ethernet Forum ===
The Metro Ethernet Forum's Metro Ethernet Network UNI specification defines a bidirectional Ethernet reference point for Ethernet service delivery.

=== Optical Internetworking Forum ===
The Optical Internetworking Forum defines a UNI software interface for user systems to request a network connection from an ASON/GMPLS control plane.

== See also ==
- Network termination
