= Switch virtual interface =

Logical layer-3 interface on a multilayer network switch

A switch virtual interface (SVI) or routed VLAN interface (RVI) is a virtual network interface that represents a logical layer-3 interface on a multilayer network switch.

VLANs divide broadcast domains in a local area network (LAN) environment. Whenever hosts in one VLAN need to communicate with hosts in another VLAN, the traffic must be routed between them. This is known as inter-VLAN routing. On layer-3 switches it is accomplished by the creation of layer-3 interfaces (SVIs).

An SVI is a virtual routed interface that connects a VLAN on the device to the Layer 3 router engine on the same device. Only one VLAN interface can be associated with a VLAN, but you need to configure a VLAN interface for a VLAN only when you want to route between VLANs or to provide IP host connectivity to the device through a virtual routing and forwarding (VRF) instance that is not the management VRF. When you enable VLAN interface creation, a switch creates a VLAN interface for the default VLAN (VLAN 1) to permit remote switch administration.

SVIs are generally configured for a VLAN for the following reasons:

- To allow traffic to be routed between VLANs by providing a default gateway for the VLAN.
- To provide fallback bridging (if required for non-routable protocols).
- To provide Layer 3 IP connectivity to the switch.
- To support bridging configurations and routing protocol.
- To provide an access layer - 'Routed Access' Configuration (in lieu of Spanning Tree Protocol)

Advantages include:

- Much faster than router-on-a-stick, because everything is hardware-switched and -routed.
- No need for external links from the switch to a router for routing.
- Not limited to one link. Layer 2 EtherChannels can be used between the switches to get more bandwidth.
- Latency is much lower, because it does not need to leave the switch.
