= IEEE 802.10 =

International standard

IEEE 802.10 is a former standard for security functions that could be used in both local area networks and metropolitan area networks based on IEEE 802 protocols.

802.10 specifies security association management and key management, as well as access control, data confidentiality and data integrity.

The IEEE 802.10 standards were withdrawn in January 2004 and this working group of the IEEE 802 is not currently active. Security for wireless networks was standardized in 802.11i.

The Cisco Inter-Switch Link (ISL) protocol for supporting VLANs on Ethernet and similar LAN technologies was based on IEEE 802.10; in this application 802.10 has largely been replaced by IEEE 802.1Q.

The standard being developed has 8 parts:

a. Model, including security management
b. Secure Data Exchange (SDE) protocol
c. Key Management
d. - has now been incorporated in 'a' -
e. SDE Over Ethernet 2.0
f. SDE Sublayer Management
g. SDE Security Labels
h. SDE PICS Conformance.

Parts b, e, f, g, and h are incorporated in IEEE Standard 802.10-1998.
