= Address spoofing =

Address spoofing may refer to:

- IP address spoofing
- MAC spoofing
