= MMRP =

MMRP is an initialism that may refer to one of the following:

- Multiple MAC Registration Protocol, defined by the IEEE 802.1Q group.
- Mobile Mesh Routing Protocol, largely replaced by Optimized Link State Routing Protocol (OLSR).
