= Lansweeper =

IT discovery and inventory platform

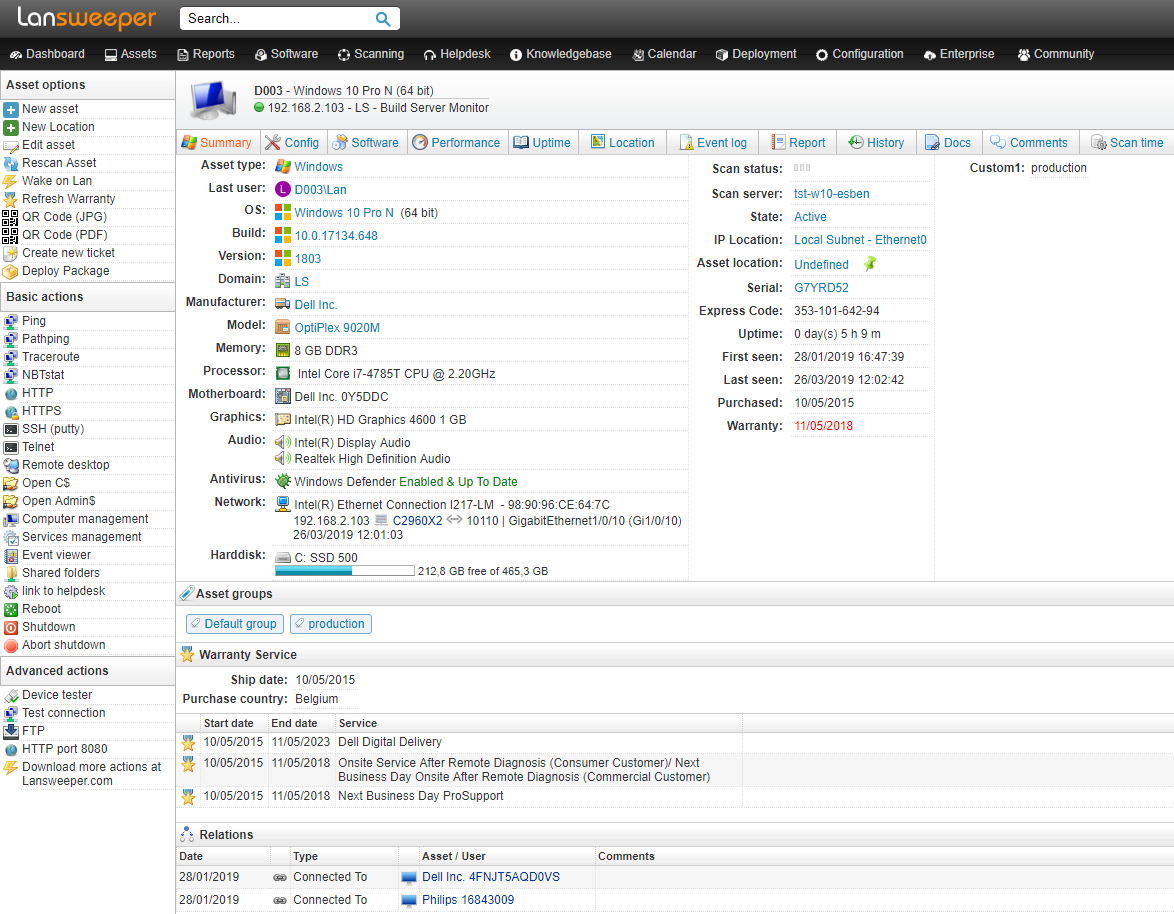
- Lansweeper Windows asset overview
- Initial release: 2005 or earlier (Note: The domain lansweeper.com was first registered 4 June 2004)
- Stable release: 12.5.4.0
- Operating system: Microsoft Windows
- Type: IT asset management
- License: Proprietary
- Website: www.lansweeper.com

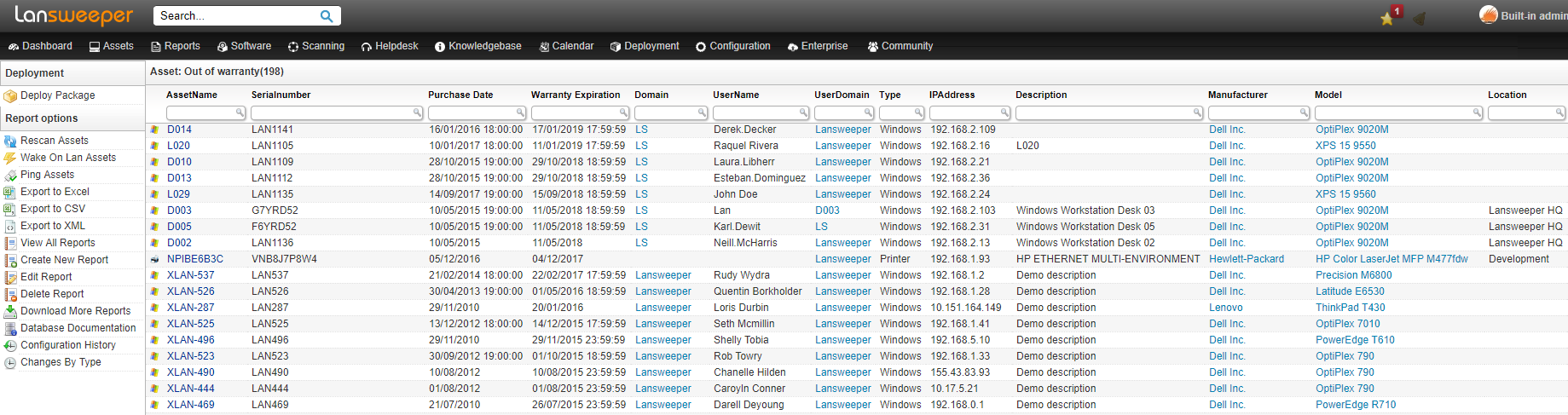
Out of warranty report

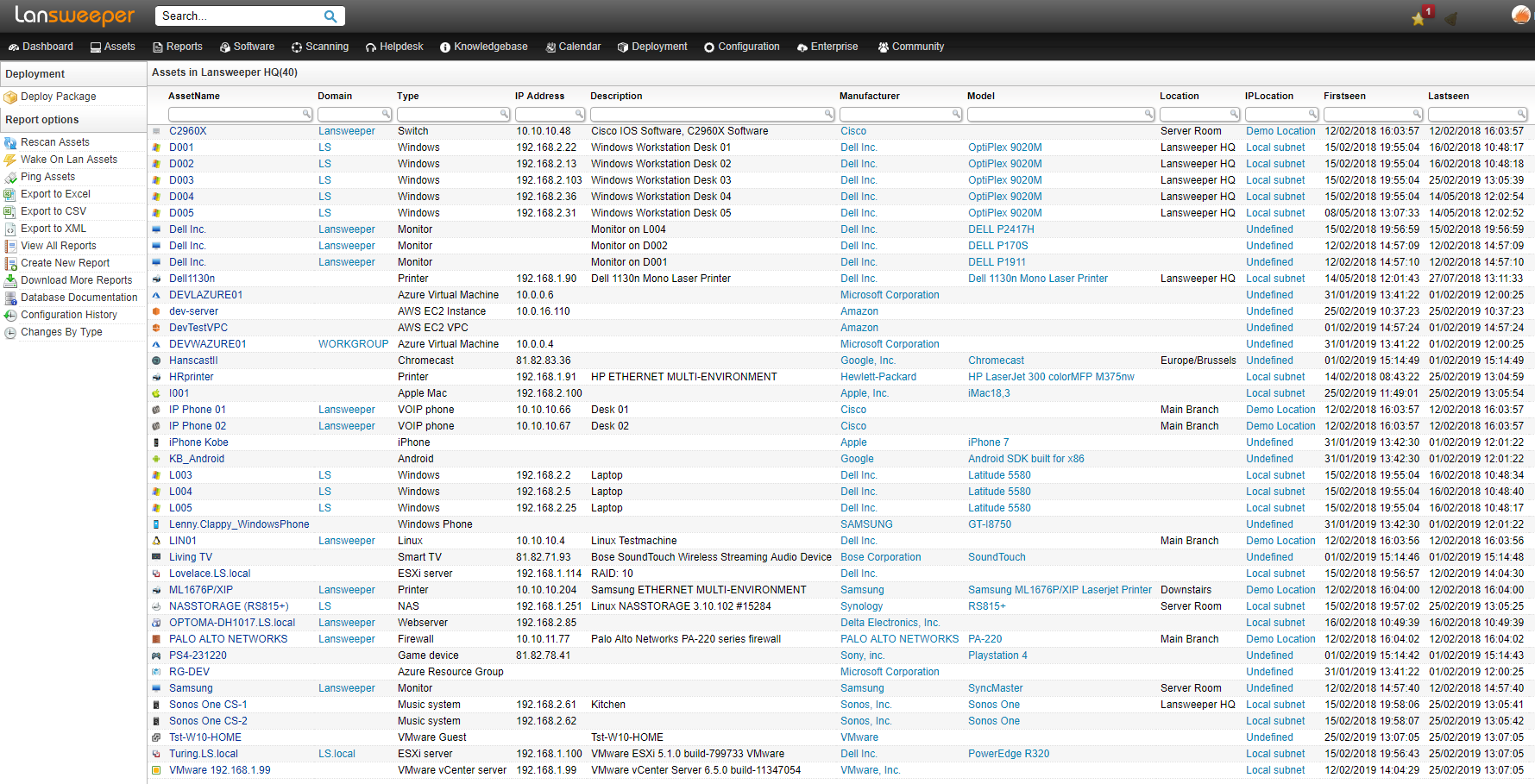
Static group view

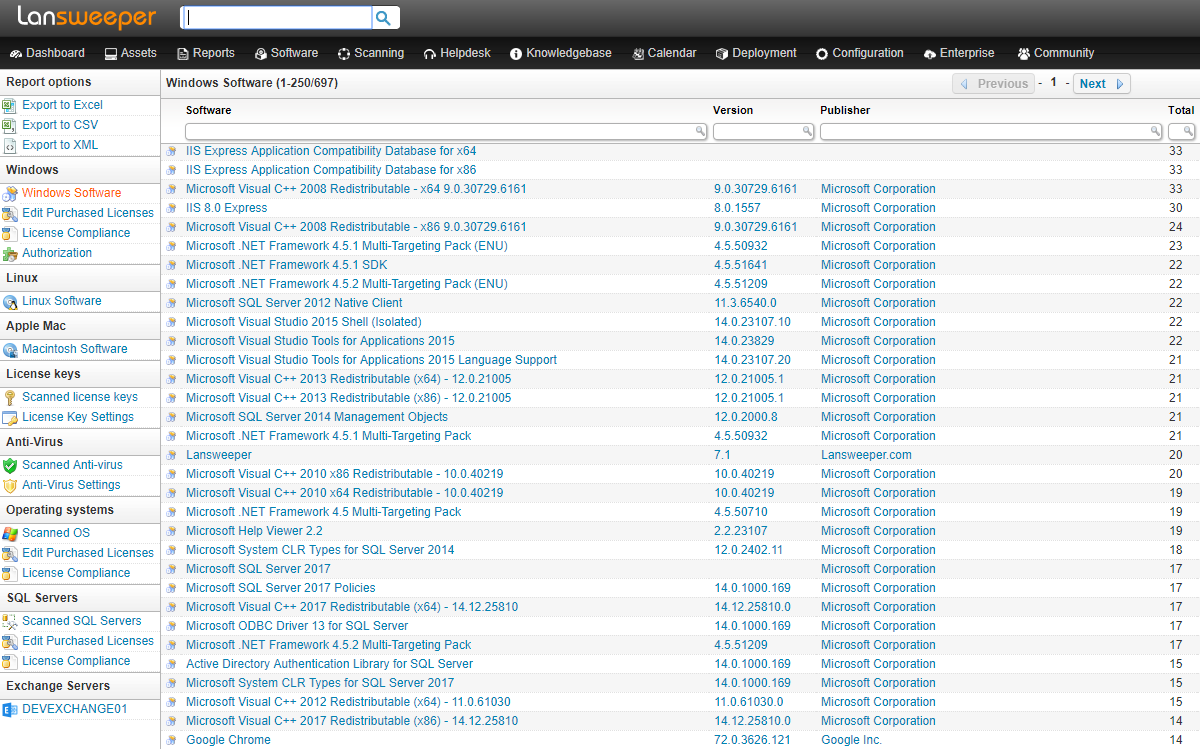
Software overview

Lansweeper is an IT discovery & inventory platform which delivers insights into the status of users, devices, and software within IT environments. This platform inventories connected IT devices, enabling organizations to centrally manage their IT infrastructure. Lansweeper's automated processes identify and compile a list of connected devices, including computers, routers, servers, and printers. It furnishes device-specific information covering installed software, applied updates & patches, and user details.

== History ==
Lansweeper was founded in Belgium in 2004.

In October 2020, Lansweeper announced the acquisition of Fing, a network scanning and device recognition platform.

In June 2021, Lansweeper received a €130 million investment from Insight Partners.

== Description ==
The main purpose of Lansweeper derives from a discovery phase of sweeping round a local area network (LAN) and maintaining an inventory of the hardware assets and software deployed on those assets. Reports from the inventory enable complete hardware and software reports on the devices and can be used to identify problems. Lansweeper can collect information on all Windows, Linux and macOS devices as well as IP-addressable network appliances.

The software incorporates an integrated ticket-based Help Desk module used to assist issues to be captured and tracked through to completion. There is also a software module that allows Lansweeper to orchestrate software updates on Windows computers.

The Lansweeper central inventory database must be located on either an SQL Local DB or SQL Server database on a Microsoft Windows machine. Lansweeper claims that while a minimum default configuration can be supported by placing all its components on a single server, the application has the capability to scale up to hundreds of thousands of devices. While Lansweeper can be set up agentless, it may be recommended to use agents for more complex configurations.

Lansweeper has a freeware version of the product, but it is limited in the number of devices available and functionality provided unless appropriate commercial licenses are purchased.
