= MAC spoofing =

Changing a factory-assigned MAC address

MAC spoofing is a technique for changing a factory-assigned Media Access Control (MAC) address of a network interface on a networked device. The MAC address that is hard-coded on a network interface controller (NIC) cannot be changed. However, many drivers allow the MAC address to be changed. Additionally, there are tools which can make an operating system believe that the NIC has the MAC address of a user's choosing. The process of masking a MAC address is known as MAC spoofing. Essentially, MAC spoofing entails changing a computer's identity, for any reason.

== Motivation ==
Changing the assigned MAC address may allow the user to bypass access control lists on servers or routers, either hiding a computer on a network or allowing it to impersonate another network device. It may also allow the user to bypass MAC address blacklisting to regain access to a Wi-Fi network. However, MAC spoofing does not work when trying to bypass parental controls if automatic MAC filtering is turned on. MAC spoofing is done for legitimate and illicit purposes alike.

=== New hardware for existing Internet Service Providers (ISP) ===
Many ISPs register the client's MAC address for service and billing services. Since MAC addresses are unique and hard-coded on network interface controller (NIC) cards, when the client wants to connect a new device or change an existing one, the ISP will detect different MAC addresses and might not grant Internet access to those new devices. This can be circumvented easily by MAC spoofing, with the client only needing to spoof the new device's MAC address so it appears to be the MAC address that was registered by the ISP. In this case, the client spoofs their MAC address to gain Internet access from multiple devices. While this is generally a legitimate case, MAC spoofing of new devices can be considered illegal if the ISP's user agreement prevents the user from connecting more than one device to their service. Moreover, the client is not the only person who can spoof their MAC address to gain access to the ISP. Computer crackers can gain unauthorized access to the ISP via the same technique. This allows them to gain access to unauthorized services, while being difficult to identify and track as they are using the client's identity. This action is considered an illegitimate and illegal use of MAC spoofing.

This also applies to customer-premises equipment, such as cable and DSL modems. If leased to the customer on a monthly basis, the equipment has a hard-coded MAC address known to the provider's distribution networks, allowing service to be established as long as the customer is not in billing arrears. In cases where the provider allows customers to provide their own equipment (and thus avoid the monthly leasing fee on their bill), the provider sometimes requires that the customer provide the MAC address of their equipment before service is established.

=== Fulfilling software requirements ===
Some software can only be installed and run on systems with pre-defined MAC addresses as stated in the software end-user license agreement, and users have to comply with this requirement in order to gain access to the software. If the user has to install different hardware due to malfunction of the original device or if there is a problem with the user's NIC card, then the software will not recognize the new hardware. However, this problem can be solved using MAC spoofing. The user has to spoof the new MAC address so that it appears to be the address that was in use when the software was registered. Legal issues might arise if the software is run on multiple devices at once by using MAC spoofing. At the same time, the user can access software for which they have not secured a license. Contacting the software vendor might be the safest route to take if there is a hardware problem preventing access to the software.

Some softwares may also perform MAC filtering in an attempt to ensure unauthorized users cannot gain access to certain networks which would otherwise be freely accessible with the software. Such cases can be considered illegitimate or illegal activity and legal action may be taken.

=== Identity masking ===
If a user chooses to spoof their MAC address in order to protect their privacy, this is called identity masking. As an example motivation, on Wi-Fi network connections a MAC address is not encrypted. Even the secure IEEE 802.11i-2004 (WPA) encryption method does not prevent Wi-Fi networks from sending out MAC addresses. Hence, in order to avoid being tracked, the user might choose to spoof the device's MAC address. However, computer crackers use the same technique to bypass access control methods such as MAC filtering, without revealing their identity. MAC filtering prevents access to a network if the MAC address of the device attempting to connect does not match any addresses marked as allowed, which is used by some networks. Computer crackers can use MAC spoofing to gain access to networks utilising MAC filtering if any of the allowed MAC addresses are known to them, possibly with the intent of causing damage, while appearing to be one of the legitimate users of the network. As a result, the real offender may go undetected by law enforcement.

=== MAC Address Randomization in WiFi ===
To prevent third parties from using MAC addresses to track devices, Android, Linux, iOS, macOS, and Windows have implemented MAC address randomization. In June 2014, Apple announced that future versions of iOS would randomize MAC addresses for all WiFi connections. The Linux kernel has supported MAC address randomization during network scans since March 2015, but drivers need to be updated to use this feature. Windows has supported it since the release of Windows 10 in July 2015.

== Controversy ==
Although MAC address spoofing is not illegal, its practice has caused controversy in some cases. In the 2012 indictment against Aaron Swartz, an Internet hacktivist who was accused of illegally accessing files from the JSTOR digital library, prosecutors claimed that because he had spoofed his MAC address, this showed purposeful intent to commit criminal acts. In June 2014, Apple announced that future versions of their iOS platform would randomize MAC addresses for all WiFi connections, making it more difficult for internet service providers to track user activities and identities, which resurrected moral and legal arguments surrounding the practice of MAC spoofing among several blogs and newspapers.

== Limitations ==
MAC address spoofing is limited to the local broadcast domain. Unlike IP address spoofing, where senders spoof their IP address in order to cause the receiver to send the response elsewhere, in MAC address spoofing the response is usually received by the spoofing party if MAC filtering is not turned on making the spoofer able to impersonate a new device.

== See also ==
- iproute2, a Linux utility that can spoof host MAC addresses
- Promiscuous mode
