= MAC filtering =

Computer network security technique

In computer networking, MAC address filtering is a network access control method whereby the MAC address assigned to each network interface controller is used to determine access to the network.

MAC addresses are uniquely assigned to each card, so using MAC filtering on a network permits and denies network access to specific devices through the use of blacklists and whitelists. While the restriction of network access through the use of lists is straightforward, an individual person is not identified by a MAC address, but rather a device only, so an authorized person will need to have a whitelist entry for each device that they would like to access the network.

While giving a network some additional protection, MAC filtering can be circumvented by using a packet analyzer to find a valid MAC and then using MAC spoofing to access the network using that address. MAC address filtering can be considered as security through obscurity because the effectiveness is based on "the secrecy of the implementation or its components".

== Port security ==
Many devices that support MAC filtering do so on a device basis. Whitelisted MAC addresses are allowed through any port on the device, and blacklisted MAC addresses are blocked on all ports. Other devices, such as Cisco Catalyst switches, support MAC filtering on a port-by-port basis. This is referred to as port security. Port security may be configured statically with a list, dynamically based on the first given number of addresses detected, or a combination of these two methods. When port security is configured, the default settings are to allow only one MAC address per port and to shut down the port if the allowed number of addresses is exceeded.

== See also ==
- Access-control list
- IP address blocking
- Private VLAN
