= Bridge router =

Networking device that works as a bridge and as a router

A bridge router or brouter is a network device that works as a bridge and as a router. The brouter routes packets for known protocols and simply forwards all other packets as a bridge would.

Brouters operate at both the network layer for routable protocols and at the data link layer for non-routable protocols. As networks continue to become more complex, a mix of routable and non-routable protocols has led to the need for the combined features of bridges and routers. Brouters handle both routable and non-routable features by acting as routers for routable protocols and bridges for non-routable protocols. Bridged protocols might propagate throughout the network, but techniques such as filtering and learning might be used to reduce potential congestion. Brouters are used as connecting devices in the networking system, so they act as a bridge in a network and as a router in an internetwork.

== See also ==
- Multilayer switch
