= Trunking =

Means of sharing telecommunications resources

In telecommunications, trunking is a technology for providing network access to multiple clients simultaneously by sharing a set of circuits, carriers, channels, or frequencies, instead of providing individual circuits or channels for each client. This is reminiscent to the structure of a tree with one trunk and many branches. Trunking in telecommunication originated in telegraphy, and later in telephone systems where a trunk line is a communications channel between telephone exchanges.

Other applications include the trunked radio systems commonly used by police agencies.

In the form of link aggregation and VLAN tagging, trunking has been applied in computer networking.

== Telecommunications ==
A trunk line is a circuit connecting telephone switchboards (or other switching equipment), as distinguished from local loop circuit which extends from telephone exchange switching equipment to individual telephones or information origination/termination equipment. Early telephony trunk lines used carrier telephony to increase capacity.

Trunk lines are used for connecting a private branch exchange (PBX) to a telephone service provider. When needed they can be used by any telephone connected to the PBX, while the station lines to the extensions serve only one station’s telephones. Trunking saves cost, because there are usually fewer trunk lines than extension lines, since it is unusual in most offices to have all extension lines in use for external calls at once. Trunk lines transmit voice and data in formats such as analog, T1, E1, ISDN, PRI or SIP. The dial tone lines for outgoing calls are called DDCO (Direct Dial Central Office) trunks.

In the UK and the Commonwealth countries, a trunk call was the term for long-distance calling which traverses one or more trunk lines and involving more than one telephone exchange. This is in contrast to making a local call which involves a single exchange and typically no trunk lines.

Trunking also refers to the connection of switches and circuits within a telephone exchange. Trunking is closely related to the concept of grading. Trunking allows a group of inlet switches at the same time. Thus the service provider can provide a lesser number of circuits than might otherwise be required, allowing many users to "share" a smaller number of connections and achieve capacity savings.

== Computer networks ==
=== Link aggregation ===
In computer networking, port trunking is the use of multiple concurrent network connections to aggregate the link speed of each participating port and cable, also called link aggregation. Such high-bandwidth link groups may be used to interconnect switches or to connect high-performance servers to a network.

=== VLAN ===
In the context of Ethernet VLANs, Cisco uses the term Ethernet trunking to mean carrying multiple VLANs through a single network link through the use of a trunking protocol. To allow for multiple VLANs on one link, frames from individual VLANs must be identified. The most common and preferred method, IEEE 802.1Q, adds a tag to the Ethernet frame labeling it as belonging to a certain VLAN. Since 802.1Q is an open standard it can work with equipment from any vendor. Cisco also has a (now deprecated) proprietary trunking protocol called Inter-Switch Link which encapsulates the Ethernet frame with its own container, which labels the frame as belonging to a specific VLAN. 3Com used proprietary Virtual LAN Trunking (VLT) before 802.1Q was defined.

== Radio communications ==
In two-way radio communications, trunking refers to the ability of transmissions to be served by free channels whose availability is determined by algorithmic protocols. In conventional (i.e., not trunked) radio, users of a single service share one or more exclusive radio channels and must wait their turn to use them, analogous to the operation of a group of cashiers in a grocery store, where each cashier serves his/her own line of customers. The cashier represents each radio channel, and each customer represents a radio user transmitting on their radio.

Trunked radio systems (TRS) pool all of the cashiers (channels) into one group and use a store manager (site controller) that assigns incoming shoppers to free cashiers as determined by the store's policies (TRS protocols).

In a TRS, individual transmissions in any conversation may take place on several different channels. In the shopping analogy, this is as if a family of shoppers checks out all at once and are assigned different cashiers by the traffic manager. Similarly, if a single shopper checks out more than once, they may be assigned a different cashier each time.

Trunked radio systems provide greater efficiency at the cost of greater management overhead. The store manager's orders must be conveyed to all the shoppers. This is done by assigning one or more radio channels as the "control channel". The control channel transmits data from the site controller that runs the TRS, and is continuously monitored by all of the field radios in the system so that they know how to follow the various conversations between members of their talkgroups (families) and other talkgroups as they hop from radio channel to radio channel.

TRS's have grown massively in their complexity since their introduction, and now include multi-site systems that can cover entire states or groups of states. This is similar to the idea of a chain of grocery stores. The shopper generally goes to the nearest grocery store, but if there are complications or congestion, the shopper may opt to go to a neighboring store. Each store in the chain can talk to each other and pass messages between shoppers at different stores if necessary, and they provide backup to each other: if a store has to be closed for repair, then other stores pick up the customers.

TRS's have greater risks to overcome than conventional radio systems in that a loss of the store manager (site controller) would cause the system's traffic to no longer be managed. In this case, most of the time the TRS will automatically switch to an alternate control channel, or in more rare circumstances, conventional operation. In spite of these risks, TRS's usually maintain reasonable uptime.

TRS's are more difficult to monitor via radio scanner than conventional systems; however, larger manufacturers of radio scanners have introduced models that, with a little extra programming, are able to follow TRS's quite efficiently.

== See also ==
- 2600 hertz
