= VLAN Management Policy Server =

A VLAN Management Policy Server (VMPS) is a network switch that contains a mapping of device information to VLAN.

The primary goal of VMPS is VLAN assignment for general network management purposes, but can also be used for providing security through segregating clients with an unknown MAC address, or through further extension of the protocol to provide login for Cisco ACLs. This last functionality is now deprecated by Cisco, in favour of 802.1X, and as the VMPS technology is Cisco proprietary, the VLAN assignment can now be carried out in the 802.1X framework.

Client switches query the VMPS server using the VLAN Query Protocol, or VQP. Only Cisco produces hardware with VMPS client functionality, and is currently fully supported across their IOS switching lines. Cisco officially only supports the use of Catalyst 4000, 5000 and 6500 switch platforms (with appropriate firmware) as VMPS servers, but these have limited functionality, and only support a static text file transferred into them using tftp.

vmps helps with the dynamic allocation of vlan across the network.

== Third party servers ==
To enhance functionality, which can talk to SQL or use external programs to decide on network access for a given request. The first publicly available of these was OpenVMPS, by Dori Seliskar and others, with FreeRADIUS and Icarus VMPSd available and including additional management tools to help manage hundreds or thousands of clients and MAC addresses and their VMPS support.
