= Port Aggregation Protocol =

Proprietary link aggegration protocol

Port Aggregation Protocol (PAgP) is a Cisco Systems proprietary networking protocol, which is used for the automated, link aggregation of Ethernet switch ports, known as an EtherChannel. A similar protocol known as Link Aggregation Control Protocol (LACP) — released by the IEEE — is an industry standard and is not tied to a specific vendor.

PAgP messages are always sent to the well-known Cisco multicast address 01-00-0C-CC-CC-CC with protocol type code 0x0104. PAgP uses the same multicast group MAC address as Cisco Discovery Protocol (CDP).

== Cisco implementation ==
PAgP can be configured on a Cisco switch to operate in three different modes:

- auto - passive negotiation of the channel
- desirable - active negotiation of the channel
- on - no protocols are used: it assumes the other side has enabled link aggregation.

On Cisco network devices running CatOS, a single switch module may only be configured to run in either LACP or PAgP modes. Cisco devices that run IOS (native and/or non-hybrid mode boxes) support individual port configuration for LACP and are not restricted to per-module settings as with CatOS.

== Limitations ==
A limitation of Port Aggregation Protocol is that all the physical ports in the aggregation group must reside on the same switch. Cisco's 6500 and the 4500E platforms, remove this limitation using Virtual Switching System (VSS), which allows port channels to be split between two chassis.

PAgP is not supported on Cisco Nexus Switches.

== Advantages ==
With Port Aggregation Protocol "the line speed of an agport is the total of the line speeds of each of its physical ports." This does not automatically mean that a single transfer will use all of the aggregated interfaces' bandwidth; rather, this depends on the distribution method of choice. Most Cisco switches a use src/dst MAC address hash as the distribution method, meaning that a single session will use the bandwidth of a single interface. Other Cisco switches use a proprietary distribution method with true frame round-robin, enabling the maximum link speed to be the same as the sum of the interfaces composing the aggregation group. This means packet order can be altered, however.

Plain EtherChannel load-balancing works by having the switch assign a hash result from 0-7 based on the configured hash method (load-balancing algorithm) for the type of traffic. This hash result is commonly called a Result Bundle Hash (RBH). Frames are then divided over the available links. Therefore, no single flow can exceed the speed of a physical port. However, some PAgP-enabled switches can negotiate between a "maximize load balancing" and "preserve ordering" link: The former gives maximum aggregated bandwidth at the expense of packet ordering, while the latter assures no packet reordering to occur but limits a single transfer to the bandwidth of a single interface.
