= Cisco Inter-Switch Link =

Cisco Inter-Switch Link (ISL) is a Cisco proprietary link layer protocol that maintains VLAN information in Ethernet frames as traffic flows between switches and routers, or switches and switches. ISL is Cisco's VLAN encapsulation protocol and is supported only on some Cisco equipment over the Fast and Gigabit Ethernet links. It is offered as an alternative to the IEEE 802.1Q standard, a widely used VLAN tagging protocol, although the use of ISL for new sites is deprecated by Cisco.

With ISL, an Ethernet frame is encapsulated with a header that transports VLAN IDs between switches and routers. With IEEE 802.1Q the tag is internal. This is a key advantage for IEEE 802.1Q as it means tagged frames can be sent over standard Ethernet links.

ISL does add overhead to the frame as a 26-byte header containing a 10-bit VLAN ID. In addition, a 4-byte CRC is appended to the end of each frame. This CRC is in addition to any frame checking that the Ethernet frame requires. The fields in an ISL header identify the frame as belonging to a particular VLAN.

A VLAN ID is added only if the frame is forwarded out a port configured as a trunk link. If the frame is to be forwarded out a port configured as an access link, the ISL encapsulation is removed.

The size of an Ethernet encapsulated ISL frame can be expected to start from 94 bytes and increase up to 1548 bytes because of the overhead (additional fields) the protocol creates via encapsulation. ISL adds a 26-byte header (containing a 15-bit VLAN identifier) and a 4-byte CRC trailer to the frame.

Another related Cisco protocol, Dynamic Inter-Switch Link Protocol (DISL), simplifies the creation of an ISL trunk from two interconnected Fast Ethernet devices. Fast EtherChannel technology enables aggregation of two full-duplex Fast Ethernet links for high-capacity backbone connections. DISL minimizes VLAN trunk configuration procedures because only one end of a link needs to be configured as a trunk.

== See also ==
- Dynamic Trunking Protocol (DTP)

== Binod_DHFIBERNET ==
- Inter-Switch Link and IEEE 802.1Q Frame Format
