= Multiple Registration Protocol =

Registration of attribute values such as VLAN and multicast group membership

Multiple Registration Protocol (MRP), which replaced Generic Attribute Registration Protocol (GARP), is a generic registration framework defined by the IEEE 802.1ak amendment to the IEEE 802.1Q standard. MRP allows bridges, switches or other similar devices to register and de-register attribute values, such as VLAN identifiers and multicast group membership across a large local area network. MRP operates at the data link layer.

== History ==
GARP was defined by the IEEE 802.1 working group to provide a generic framework allowing bridges (or other devices like switches) to register and de-register attribute values such as VLAN identifiers and multicast group membership. GARP defines the architecture, rules of operation, state machines and variables for the registration and de-registration of attribute values. GARP was used by two applications: GARP VLAN Registration Protocol (GVRP) for registering VLAN trunking between multilayer switches, and by the GARP Multicast Registration Protocol (GMRP). The latter two were both mostly enhancements for VLAN-aware switches per definition in IEEE 802.1Q.

Multiple Registration Protocol (MRP) was introduced in order to replace GARP, with the IEEE 802.1ak amendment in 2007. The two GARP applications were also modified in order to use MRP. GMRP was replaced by Multiple MAC Registration Protocol (MMRP) and GVRP was replaced by Multiple VLAN Registration Protocol (MVRP). This change essentially moved the definitions of GARP, GVRP, and GMRP into an 802.1Q-based environment, implying they were already VLAN aware. This also allowed for significant streamlining of the underlying protocol without much change to the interface of the applications themselves.

The new protocol and applications fixed a problem with the old GARP-based GVRP-based system, where a simple registration or a failover could take an extremely long time to converge on a large network, incurring a significant bandwidth degradation.

It is expected GARP will be removed from IEEE 802.1D at some point in the future.

== Multiple MAC Registration Protocol ==
Multiple MAC Registration Protocol is a data link layer (layer 2) protocol to register group MAC addresses (i.e. multicast) on multiple switches. It is an MRP application, originally defined in IEEE 802.1ak-2007 and subsequently included in 802.1Q. It replaced the 802.1D-based GMRP. The purpose of MMRP is to allow multicast traffic in bridged LANs to be confined to areas of the network where it is required.

== Multiple VLAN Registration Protocol ==
MVRP, which replaced GVRP, is a standards-based Layer 2 network protocol, for automatic configuration of VLAN information on switches. It was defined in the 802.1ak amendment to 802.1Q-2005.

Within a layer 2 network, MVRP provides a method to dynamically share VLAN information and configure the needed VLANs. For example, in order to add a switch port to a VLAN, only the end port, or the VLAN-supporting network device connected to the switch port need be reconfigured, and all necessary VLAN trunks are dynamically created on the other MVRP-enabled switches. Without using MVRP, either a manual configuration of VLAN trunks or use of a manufacturer's proprietary method is necessary.

It is through MVRP that dynamic VLAN entries will be updated in the filtering database. In short, MVRP helps to maintain VLAN configuration dynamically based on current network configurations.

802.1Q allows for:

1. Dynamic configuration and distribution of VLAN membership information by means of the MVRP
2. Static configuration of VLAN membership information via management mechanisms, which allow configuration of static VLAN registration entries.
3. Combined static and dynamic configuration, in which some VLANs are configured via management mechanisms and for other VLANs, MVRP is relied on to establish the configuration.

MVRP defines an MRP application that provides the VLAN registration service. MVRP makes use of MRP Attribute Declaration (MAD) and MRP Attribute Propagation (MAP), which provide the common state machine descriptions and the common information propagation mechanisms defined for use in MRP-based applications. MVRP provides a mechanism for dynamic maintenance of the contents of dynamic VLAN registration entries for each VLAN, and for propagating the information they contain to other bridges. This information allows MVRP-aware devices to establish and update dynamically their knowledge of the set of VLANs that currently have active members, and through which ports those members can be reached. The main purpose of MVRP is to allow switches to automatically discover some of the VLAN information that would otherwise need to be manually configured.

=== Legacy GVRP details ===
The replaced GVRP was essentially the same thing, but it used the services of the 802.1D-based GARP application. GVRP made use of GARP Information Declaration (GID) and GARP Information Propagation (GIP), which correspond to the MAP and MAD in MRP. It was defined in the original release of 802.1D-1998 until it was replaced by MVRP.

It was replaced because the non-VLAN-aware GARP had serious deficiencies when operating in large VLAN networks.

== Stream Reservation Protocol ==
Stream Reservation Protocol, defined in Audio Video Bridging specifications, is based on MRP.

== See also ==
- VLAN Trunking Protocol (VTP): a similar but proprietary protocol from Cisco
