= EtherType =

Field in Ethernet frames indicating which protocol is encapsulated in the payload

EtherType is a two-octet field in an Ethernet frame. It is used to indicate which protocol is encapsulated in the payload of the frame and is used at the receiving end by the data link layer to determine how the payload is processed. The same field is also used to indicate the size of some Ethernet frames.

EtherType is also used as the basis of 802.1Q VLAN tagging, encapsulating packets from VLANs for transmission multiplexed with other VLAN traffic over an Ethernet trunk.

EtherType was first defined by the Ethernet II framing standard and later adapted for the IEEE 802.3 standard. EtherType values are assigned by the IEEE Registration Authority.

== Overview ==
An Ethernet frame including the EtherType field. Each lower slot designates an octet; the EtherType is two octets long.

In modern implementations of Ethernet, the field within the Ethernet frame used to describe the EtherType can also be used to represent the size of the payload of the Ethernet Frame. Historically, depending on the type of Ethernet framing that was in use on an Ethernet segment, both interpretations were simultaneously valid, leading to potential ambiguity. Ethernet II framing considered these octets to represent EtherType, while the original IEEE 802.3 framing considered these octets to represent the size of the payload in bytes.

In order to allow Ethernet II and IEEE 802.3 framing to be used on the same Ethernet segment, a unifying standard, IEEE 802.3x-1997, was introduced that required that EtherType values be greater than or equal to 1536. That value was chosen because the maximum length (MTU) of the data field of an Ethernet 802.3 frame is 1500 bytes and 1536 (decimal) is 0x600 (hexadecimal). Thus, values of 1500 and below for this field indicate that the field is used as the size of the payload of the Ethernet frame, while values of 1536 and above indicate that the field is used to represent an EtherType. The interpretation of values 1501–1535, inclusive, is undefined.

The end of a frame is signaled by a valid frame check sequence followed by loss of carrier or by a special symbol or sequence in the line coding scheme for a particular Ethernet physical layer, so the length of the frame does not always need to be encoded as a value in the Ethernet frame. However, as the minimum payload of an Ethernet frame is 46 bytes, a protocol that uses EtherType must include its own length field if that is necessary for the recipient of the frame to determine the length of short packets (if allowed) for that protocol.

== VLAN tagging ==
Insertion of the 802.1Q VLAN tag (four octets) into an Ethernet-II frame, with a typical VLAN arrangement of a tag protocol identifier (TPID) EtherType value of 0x8100. A QinQ arrangement would add another four-octet tag containing a two-octet TPID using various EtherType values.

802.1Q VLAN tagging uses a 0x8100 EtherType value. The payload following includes a 2-byte tag control identifier (TCI) followed by an Ethernet frame beginning with a second (original) EtherType field for consumption by end stations. IEEE 802.1ad extends this tagging with further nested EtherType and TCI pairs.

== Jumbo LLC frames ==
The size of the payload of jumbo frames, typically up to ≈9000 octets long, collides with the range used by EtherType. Therefore, it cannot be used for indicating the length of such a frame in the old 802.2/802.3 formats that have a length field (i.e. LLC, SNAP and raw 802.3) in place of the EtherType field.

The IETF ISIS working group originally proposed to resolve this conflict by substituting 0x8870 as EtherType for frames exceeding 1500 octets in length. This was initially rejected by the IEEE's 802.3 working group, as documented in an appendix to the IETF draft. However, about 15 years later, the concept was picked up by the 802.1 working group and incorporated into 802.1AC-2016, but due to issues in confirming ownership of the 0x8870 value,, a new value (0xC9D1) was assigned. This value, had it gained any widespread use, would've led to interoperability issues and was relatively quickly rectified to use the original 0x8870 value in 802.1AC-2016/Cor 1-2018 0xC9D1 thus became an historic oddity.

Effectively, 802.1AC-2016/Cor 1-2018 has thus retroactively standardized the practice used by router vendors in their IS-IS implementations (for IIH Hello packets padding and extended size LSPs).

Even though IEEE 802.3 does not currently permit jumbo frames with the commonly used limits in the 9000s of octets, it does permit payloads of up to 1982 octets. This means that for a long time, it was not possible to use the maximum standard frame size from IEEE 802.3 together with the encapsulations defined in IEEE 802.2.

== Use beyond Ethernet ==
With the advent of the IEEE 802 suite of standards, a Subnetwork Access Protocol (SNAP) header combined with an IEEE 802.2 LLC header is used to transmit the EtherType of a payload for IEEE 802 networks other than Ethernet, as well as for non-IEEE networks that use the IEEE 802.2 LLC header, such as FDDI. However, for Ethernet, Ethernet II framing is still used.

== Registration ==
EtherTypes are assigned by the IEEE Registration Authority, which publishes them in list format. The Internet Assigned Numbers Authority has a separate list of some EtherType registrations, compiled from several sources, including the IEEE Registration Authority's list and some other lists.

== Values ==
EtherType values for some notable protocols
EtherType value (hexadecimal)	Protocol
0x0800	Internet Protocol version 4 (IPv4)
0x0804	Chaosnet
0x0806	Address Resolution Protocol (ARP)
0x0842	Wake-on-LAN
0x22EA	Stream Reservation Protocol
0x22F0	Audio Video Transport Protocol (AVTP)
0x22F3	IETF TRILL Protocol
0x6002	DEC MOP RC
0x6003	DECnet Phase IV, DNA Routing
0x6004	DEC LAT
0x8035	Reverse Address Resolution Protocol (RARP)
0x809B	AppleTalk (EtherTalk)
0x80D5	LLC PDU (in particular, IBM SNA), preceded by 2 bytes length and 1 byte padding
0x80F3	AppleTalk Address Resolution Protocol (AARP)
0x8100	VLAN-tagged frame (IEEE 802.1Q) and Shortest Path Bridging IEEE 802.1aq with NNI compatibility
0x8102	Simple Loop Prevention Protocol (SLPP)
0x8103	Virtual Link Aggregation Control Protocol (VLACP)
0x8137	IPX
0x8204	QNX Qnet (Transparent Distributed Processing)
0x86DD	Internet Protocol Version 6 (IPv6)
0x8808	Ethernet flow control
0x8809	Ethernet Slow Protocols such as the Link Aggregation Control Protocol (LACP)
0x8819	CobraNet
0x8847	MPLS unicast
0x8848	MPLS multicast
0x8863	PPPoE Discovery Stage
0x8864	PPPoE Session Stage
0x8870	LLC (802.2) frames exceeding 1500 octets in length, primarily used by IS-IS
0x887B	HomePlug 1.0 MME
0x888E	EAP over LAN (IEEE 802.1X)
0x8892	PROFINET Protocol
0x889A	HyperSCSI (SCSI over Ethernet)
0x88A2	ATA over Ethernet
0x88A4	EtherCAT Protocol
0x88A8	Service VLAN tag identifier (S-Tag) on Q-in-Q tunnel (802.1ad)
0x88AB	Ethernet Powerlink
0x88B8	GOOSE (Generic Object Oriented Substation event)
0x88B9	GSE (Generic Substation Events) Management Services
0x88BA	SV (Sampled Value Transmission)
0x88BF	MikroTik RoMON (unofficial)
0x88CC	Link Layer Discovery Protocol (LLDP)
0x88CD	SERCOS III
0x88E1	HomePlug Green PHY
0x88E3	Media Redundancy Protocol (IEC62439-2)
0x88E5	IEEE 802.1AE MAC security (MACsec)
0x88E7	Provider Backbone Bridges (PBB) (IEEE 802.1ah)
0x88F7	Precision Time Protocol (PTP) over IEEE 802.3 Ethernet
0x88F8	NC-SI
0x88FB	Parallel Redundancy Protocol (PRP)
0x8902	IEEE 802.1ag Connectivity Fault Management (CFM) Protocol / ITU-T Recommendation Y.1731 (OAM)
0x8906	Fibre Channel over Ethernet (FCoE)
0x8914	FCoE Initialization Protocol
0x8915	RDMA over Converged Ethernet (RoCE)
0x891D	TTEthernet Protocol Control Frame (TTE)
0x893a	1905.1 IEEE Protocol
0x892F	High-availability Seamless Redundancy (HSR)
0x9000	Ethernet Configuration Testing Protocol
0x9100	Service VLAN tag identifier (S-Tag) on Q-in-Q tunnel (pre-standard)
0x9200	Service VLAN tag identifier (S-Tag) on Q-in-Q tunnel (pre-standard)
0xF1C1	Redundancy Tag (IEEE 802.1CB Frame Replication and Elimination for Reliability)

A beige background indicates protocols that have fallen into general disuse even in their intended fields, or have become completely historic.

== See also ==
- Port (computer networking)
