= Avnu Alliance =

Consortium supporting low-latency audio networking standards

- Founded: August 25, 2009
- Type: Consortium, nonprofit
- Purpose: Certification of open standards
- Location(s): Beaverton, Oregon; United States
- Region served: Worldwide
- Method: Industry standards, Avnu Certification, Milan Certification
- Members: 60+
- Website: www.avnu.org

Avnu Alliance is a consortium of member companies working together to create an interoperable ecosystem of low-latency, time-synchronized, highly reliable networking devices using the Audio Video Bridging (AVB) and Time-Sensitive Networking (TSN) IEEE standards and its professional AV networking protocol, Milan. Avnu Alliance creates comprehensive certification programs to ensure interoperability of network devices.

== History ==
Audio Video Bridging is the set of standards developed by the IEEE Audio Video Bridging Task Group of the IEEE 802.1 standards committee. The committee developed the original technical standards for AVB, a way to simplify audio and video streaming through the use of the Ethernet cable, rather than the complicated approach traditionally taken using an array of analog one-way, single-purpose and point-to-point cables.

Avnu Alliance was launched on August 25, 2009, to create certification processes based on AVB standards that would ensure interoperability. Founding members include: Broadcom, Cisco Systems, Harman International, Intel and Xilinx.

In 2012, Avnu Alliance announced the formation of Avnu Automotive AVB Gen2 Council (AAA2C), a committee of automotive industry experts that will collectively identify automotive requirements for future development of the second generation of AVB standards.

In April 2013, the forum launched the Avnu Alliance Broadcast Advisory Council (AABAC) to assess and improve AVB requirements in the broadcast industry. Created with the participation of Avnu Alliance members, network technologists and broadcasters, the AABAC also intends to promote the use of AVB in broadcast applications.

Avnu Alliance's president is Dave Cavalcanti of Intel Corporation, Gary Stuebing of Cisco is vice president and chairman of Avnu Alliance.

== Certification ==
Avnu Alliance invites industry companies to participate and collaborate in their efforts to improve audio/video quality. Their members create a broad array of products, including cars, semiconductors, loudspeakers, consoles and microphones. By 2012, Avnu Alliance had created a single set of open standards for AVB, which it uses to certify devices to guarantee interoperability.

Since January 2012, Avnu Alliance has worked with the test house, the University of New Hampshire InterOperability Laboratory (UNH-IOL), to test interoperability and provide validation for its certified products. Avnu's certification testing officially began at UNH-IOL in February 2013. The UNH-IOL is a neutral, independent testing service that works with other audio/video industry consortiums, including the Ethernet Alliance, Wi-Fi Alliance and IPv6 Forum, to provide third-party verification, lower costs through collaborative testing, and help guide industry acceptance of a technology standard.

In October 2021, Avnu Alliance expanded global TSN testing with new Registered Test Facilities (RTF) around the world including: Allion in Taichung, Taiwan; Excelfore in Tokyo, Japan; and Granite River Labs in both Santa Clara, CA, USA and Karlsruhe, Germany.

The technology ecosystem supporting and accelerating the development of Avnu certified products has matured to include standards-compliant silicon devices, FPGA IP, open-source software, and also 3rd-party AVB certification services such as Coveloz's AVB Certification Service.

When a product is submitted to Avnu Alliance for certification, it is tested against over 400 pages of conformance requirements, which combine IEEE 802.1 standard requirements with additional requirements developed by Avnu. Any issues the product may have are then reported to the manufacturer. After fixing any outstanding issues, the manufacturer can submit the product to Avnu for official approval and permission to use the Avnu certification logo on the product and any accompanying marketing efforts.

In February 2014, Avnu Alliance announced their first certified products, a series of AVB switches from Extreme Networks that passed all conformance tests and will bear the Avnu-certified logo. Extreme Networks' Summit X440 is a series of stackable switches that extend the benefits of the ExtremeXOS software. They are intended for professional AV and IT applications, allowing data, audio and video to co-exist on a single standards-based network.

== Standardization ==
The Avnu Alliance's goal is to make it easier to implement network systems by promoting the adoption of the IEEE 802.1, 1722 and 1733 AVB standards in automotive, professional and consumer electronics markets, ensuring that AVB products from different manufacturers would be able to interconnect seamlessly. Along with ensuring interoperability, the adoption of IEEE 802.1 (and the related IEEE 1722 and IEEE 1733) AVB standards over various networks would reduce technical issues, such as synching, glitches and delays, while improving content streaming capabilities. The Alliance's industry standards improved Ethernet technology, making it simpler to add enhanced performance and capabilities to audio/video networks, while bringing down costs by using lighter, cheaper cable that is easier to set up and able to carry a larger amount of information than what was regularly used in networking environments.

=== Milan ===
In 2018, the Avnu Alliance announced the Milan (Media-integrated local area network), an initiative to define implementation details such as media formats, clocking, redundancy and device control, and provide certification and testing program to ensure that devices from different vendors are interoperable within common device profiles.

Alliance member companies worked together to develop Milan: a standards-based, user-driven deterministic network protocol for professional media, that through certification, assures devices will work together at new levels of convenience, reliability, and functionality. Milan™ is a standards-based deterministic network protocol for real-time media. Avnu Members may use the Avnu-certified or Milan-certified logo on devices that pass the conformance tests from Avnu. Not every device based on AVB or TSN is submitted for certification to the Avnu Alliance. The lack of the Avnu logo does not necessarily imply a device is incompatible with other Avnu-certified devices. The Alliance, in conjunction with other complementary standards bodies and alliances, provides a united network foundation for use in professional AV, automotive, industrial control and consumer segments.

Milan specification is based on the following IEEE standards:

- IEEE 802.1BA-2011 Audio Video Bridging (AVB) Systems - consists of usage-specific profiles for device interoperability;
- IEEE 802.1Q-2011 Media Access Control (MAC) Bridges and Virtual Bridged Local Area Networks - defines methods for traffic shaping (Forwarding and Queuing for Time-Sensitive Streams) and bandwidth reservation (Stream Reservation Protocol) in network bridges and VLANs;
- IEEE 802.1AS-2011 Timing and Synchronization for Time-Sensitive Applications - defines the Generalized Precision Time Protocol (gPTP);
- IEEE 1722-2016 Layer 2 Transport Protocol for Time Sensitive Applications - defines (AV Transport Protocol, AVTP) and payload formats;
- IEEE 1722.1-2013 Device Discovery, Enumeration, Connection Management and Control Protocol (AVDECC).

The specification requires media clocking based on the IEEE 1722 CRF (Clock Reference Format) and sample rate of 48 kHz (optionally 96 and 192 kHz); audio stream format is based on IEEE 1722 32-bit Standard AAF Audio Format with 8 channels per stream (optionally, 24 and 32 bit High Capacity Format with 56 and 64 channels). Redundancy is provided with two independent logical networks for every endpoint and a seamless switchover mechanism. AVDECC defines operations to discover device addition and removal, retrieve device entity model, connect and disconnect streams, manage device and connection status, and remote control devices.

In October 2021, Avnu Alliance introduced the Milan Advanced Certification Program to make certification testing more streamlined for its members including the introduction of the Avnu Express Test Tool that vendors can use to internally verify device conformance prior to submission for certification testing, providing valuable insights into the product that can be used to optimize product development, increasing the probability of certification success, and saving manufacturers time, resources, and money.

== Markets ==
=== Automotive ===
The Alliance members represent a variety of facets of automotive technology. Because of the growing complexity of in-vehicle audio/video systems and the increasing number of in-vehicle applications (such as infotainment, safety and multiple cameras), testing to ensure interoperability is increasingly important in the automotive market. Automotive systems with multiple applications require interoperability to work properly. As of 2013, Avnu Alliance works with the GENIVI Alliance and the JASPAR Alliance to standardize in-vehicle Ethernet requirements.

=== Professional AV ===
The IEEE AVB Task Group has developed a series of enhancements that provide highly-reliable delivery of low latency, synchronized audio and video. This technology enables the construction of affordable, high performance professional media networks. Video interoperability specifications for the pro market are currently in development.

Meyer Sound was noted for adopting Avnu Alliance's Ethernet standards to assist in the development of its first AVB-capable loudspeaker, named CAL, which stands for column array loudspeaker, completed in 2013.

=== Consumer electronics ===
The improvements to Ethernet developed by IEEE's AVB task force also benefit those desiring to distribute digital content among multiple devices in their home networks. In 2013, the Avnu Alliance began to establish testing requirements for AVB interoperability specifications for reliable, time-synced AV streaming over Ethernet and wireless networks in residential applications.

=== Industrial control ===
Avnu's Industrial group defines compliance and interoperability requirements for TSN networking elements.

== Milestones ==
Date	Event
April 15, 2009	Avnu Alliance is incorporated
August 25, 2009	Avnu Alliance launches and adds first promoter members
January 19, 2010	IEEE publishes first AVB standard
March 7, 2012	Avnu Alliance partners with UNH-IOL to create certification program for AVB products
February 12, 2013	Avnu Alliance opens bridge certification
April 1, 2013	Avnu Alliance opens endpoint certification
February 20, 2014	First certified AVB products announced
June 1, 2018	Milan specifications and device certification announced
October 13, 2021	Avnu Alliance opens certification testing at new test houses around the world

== See also ==
- IEEE Standards Association
