= OPEN Alliance SIG =

- OPEN Alliance SIG logo
- Formation: Nov. 9, 2011
- Type: Non-profit
- Headquarters: California
- Region served: International
- Members: 300+
- Website: Official website

The OPEN Alliance is a non-profit, special interest group (SIG) of mainly automotive industry and technology providers collaborating to encourage wide scale adoption of Ethernet-based communication as the standard in automotive networking applications.

The member companies of the OPEN Alliance take advantage of the scalability and flexibility of Ethernet to allow for cost-effective communication networks in vehicles with reduced complexity. An Ethernet-based communication network is also a key infrastructure element for future customer functions like autonomous driving and the connected car.

== History ==
Traditional automotive networks such as CAN, LIN, FlexRay, MOST were unable to meet the higher data rate requirements of emerging automotive applications such as advanced driver assistance systems (ADAS), Infotainment or fast update of various ECUs in vehicles. This led BMW to investigate new standard based networking technologies such as Ethernet in 2004. Standard 100BASE-TX Fast Ethernet met automotive requirements for higher bandwidth and also provided flexibility in networking topology but it had limitations in meeting the automotive EMC requirements.

In collaboration with Broadcom, BMW customized the BroadR-Reach Ethernet technology to meet automotive EMC requirements over a single unshielded twisted pair cable. In comparison to 100BASE-TX, which requires two twisted pair cables, this had the additional advantage of reducing the cable weight and system costs further.

The OPEN Alliance was born as a result of this collaboration to create an ecosystem of vendors and partners to promote and adopt BroadR-Reach Ethernet technology for automotive in-vehicle networks and to encourage the development of new, automotive suitable Ethernet PHY solutions. In 2016, OPEN Alliance BroadR-Reach (OABR) technology was standardized and published as IEEE 802.3bw–2015 100BASE-T1 specification.

The name “OPEN” originally stood for One Pair EtherNet, and indeed both the 100BASE-T1 and the 1000BASE-T1 technologies deploy one twisted pair cables only. However, today, the OPEN Alliance supports and enables the deployment of automotive Ethernet-based communication independent of the cabling used.

== Goals and objectives ==
The objective of the OPEN Alliance SIG is to facilitate the adoption of Ethernet-based communication for in-vehicle networks:

- Enable the deployment of the existing IEEE 100BASE-T1, 1000BASE-T1 and 1000BASE-RH physical layer specifications with complementing specifications for conformance and interoperability.
- Complete the ecosystem further with requirement and test specifications for harnesses, switches, ECUs, and additional functionalities.
- Encourage and support the development of new physical layer solutions in a standards setting organization.
- Continuously identify and address gaps related to the implementation of Ethernet-based communication in automotive.

== Members ==
Founding members of the OPEN Alliance SIG are BMW, Broadcom and NXP Semiconductors. In November 2011 the companies C&S, UNH-IOL, Harman, Hyundai, Freescale and Jaguar Land Rover joined the OPEN Alliance SIG. Continental, TÜV Nord, Valeo and JAE Europe joined in December.

Since that time membership has surged to more than 300 members (as of March 22, 2016).

Membership allows companies to influence the specifications and early access to the standard specifications.

There are two types of members, Promoters and Adopters:

- Promoter can participate and contribute to the OPEN Alliance technical committees. Promoters also have the right and the duty to participate in Steering Committee meetings that deal with the organizational and strategic matters of the OPEN Alliance.
- Adopters can also participate and contribute to the OPEN Alliance technical committees just like the Promoters. Once members have contributed as an Adopter, they may apply to become a Promoter member.

A complete list of members can be found at http://www.opensig.org

== Structure of OPEN Alliance ==
=== Steering Committee ===
This committee defines the overall strategy and roadmap, manages day-to-day non-technical operations and admission of members, public relations and contractual issues. It includes BMW, Broadcom Limited, Continental, Daimler AG, General Motors Co, HARMAN, Hyundai Motor Company, Jaguar Land Rover (JLR), NXP, Realtek Semiconductor Corp, Renault SA, Renesas, Robert Bosch GmbH, Toyota, Volkswagen Group, Volvo Cars.

The key roles which are rotated are Chair, Secretary, Communications Manager, and Webstorage Administrator.

=== Technical committees [TCs] ===
Technical committees are responsible for the technical work within the OPEN Alliance. Their output is generally in form of specifications available to members and often also to non-members on the OPEN website.

==== TC1 ====
Interoperability & Compliance Tests for 100BASE-T1 PHYs

Only with an optimal specification, along with interoperability & compliance tests, are suppliers able to develop and support the fast-growing automotive Ethernet market.

To facilitate the development of compatible 100BASE-T1 products by semiconductor manufacturers, TC1 is responsible for creating, reviewing and clarifying the specification for all members.

In addition, TC1 coordinates the effort to define interoperability, compliance, and EMC requirements and test methods.

==== TC2 ====
100BASE-T1 Ethernet Channel & Components

100BASE-T1 offers a way to introduce modern signal processing in automotive, which allows optimal usage of the available channel characteristics.

TC2 goals are as follows:

- Define deterministic and robust transmission channels between the Ethernet enabled electronic control units.
- Specify requirements for Common Mode Choke (CMC), cables, connectors and harness manufacturing.
- The solution needs to be reproducible in high volumes, at high quality and meet cost targets of today’s global automotive logistics.

TC1 and TC2 in combination provide for the complete 100BASE-T1 application.

==== TC3 ====
1000BASE-T1 CMC Requirements

The potential scalability of Ethernet is an important motivation for car manufacturers to introduce Ethernet as an in-car networking technology. It is therefore essential that higher data rate Ethernet technologies are developed for automotive use. The OPEN Alliance is supporting the standardization of an Automotive Gigabit Ethernet standard through the work of TC3.

TC3 collected requirements and validated the technical proposals made available from the IEEE 802.3bp task force, leading to the release of the 1000BASE-T1 standard.

TC3 also defines 1000BASE-T1 magnetics characteristics and CMC limit lines for differential and mixed mode parameters, resulting in CMC performance and test specifications.

==== TC4 ====
Automotive Ethernet Tooling

TC4 was established to investigate tools and concluded its work in September 2013. The focus of TC4 was:

- Identify what tools are necessary to develop products that use Automotive Ethernet as a networking technology
- Develop and maintain a list of existing applicable tools from multiple vendors

==== TC5 ====
Gap Identification

To make Ethernet-based communication in automotive attractive, an overview on how to manage the entire protocol implementation is needed.

OPEN Members can identify potential issues and/or gaps when implementing Ethernet-based communication in an automotive application and submit to the OPEN Alliance which will review and decide how to address this issues.

==== TC6 ====
Common xMII Interface Definition

The focus of TC6 is to improve the applicability of existing xMII standards for Ethernet-based automotive networks with data rates of 100 Mbit/s and 1 Gbit/s. Moving towards standardized xMII specifications for the automotive industry is an important factor for the successful introduction of Ethernet into automotive networks. It will ensure product reliability and interoperability as well as reduce development time and costs.

The objective is to capture relevant automotive requirements covering technical interface topics related to physical signaling, interface logic, timing, interface speed, EMC, temperature, robustness, interoperability, energy saving and costs. Within the work packages the group analyzes existing xMII standards to identify gaps and incompatibilities in regards to automotive networks.

TC6 creates a recommendation for preferred automotive xMII standards. The document specifies relevant interface enhancements covering automotive requirements.

==== TC7 ====
1000BASE-RH Gigabit Ethernet over Plastic-Optical-Fiber (GEPOF)

TC7 summarizes automotive requirements and influences the IEEE802.3 GEPOF standardization activity. It creates supplement documents and specifications like connector interface, footprint, test suits, etc.

==== TC8 ====
Automotive Ethernet ECU Test Specification

TC8 shares requirements on Automotive Ethernet ECU testing. It defines specifications applicable to all ECUs in an Automotive Ethernet network based on these shared requirements.

It defines test process and supports the establishment of test houses that can perform the ECU tests and establishes regular audits of the test specification and the partner requirements to increase the communication quality of the Ethernet ECUs in an automotive system.

==== TC9 ====
1000BASE-T1 Ethernet Channel & Components

The physical layer for 1000BASE-T1 is a complementary technology to 100BASE-T1, enabling flexible and scalable automotive data networks. The goal of TC9 is the specification of channel and components to ensure conformance to 1000BASE-T1 link segment requirements. The Scope includes:

- 1000BASE-T1 communication channel
- Electrical requirements on connectors, cables and harness manufacturing
- Related measurement setups and test procedures
- EMC environment

The scope has been extended to include definitions and requirements on shielded twisted pair (STP) link segments for 1000BASE-T1 link segment type A in addition to the initial focus on unshielded twisted pair (UTP). Work on defining a similar specification for 10BASE-T1S has been started in TC9 as well.

==== TC10 ====
Automotive Ethernet Sleep/Wake-Up

Automotive networks rely heavily on partial networking in which some segments are hibernated and woken up on demand. TC10 will focus on establishing support for sleep modes and a wake up mechanisms tailored for automotive use cases.

Goals:

TC10 specifies the functionality and needs of an Ethernet Sleep and Wake-up concept which includes:

- Support fast wake-up and wake-up request forwarding to support a global wake-up on layer 1
- Support controlled link shutdown to hibernate selected parts of network
- Specify a requirement for global network wake-up time to link-training start
- Comply with standard MAC interfaces
- Comply with AUTOSAR network management
- No unintended wakeup in presence of interference noise
- Applicable to 100BASE-T1 and 1000BASE-T1 (if possible also to future twisted pair PHY specifications)

==== TC11 ====
Ethernet switch requirements and qualification

Goals:

Create specification and qualification requirements for Ethernet switches:

- Definition of functional features for switch semiconductors (stand-alone or built-in)
- Generic, Interfacing, Configuration
- Switching, Addressing, VLAN
- Diagnostics, Monitoring
- QoS, Queueing, Timestamping, Policing, AVB, TSN
- Filtering, Security

==== TC12 ====
Test specifications for the compliance testing of future IEEE 1000BASE-T1 (IEEE802.3bp) Physical Interface (PHY) devices

In March 2016 the SIG introduced its twelfth technical committee (TC12), aimed to create test specifications for the compliance testing of future IEEE 1000BASE-T1 (IEEE802.3bp) Physical Interface (PHY) devices. The planned specifications will cover the following areas:

- Physical Interface device Electromagnetic Compatibility (EMC)
- PCS, PMA and PHY Control compliance to 1000BASE-T1 specification
- Interoperability of 1000BASE-T1 compliant PHY implementations

==== TC13 ====
New Test House Qualification Requirements

The goal of the committee is to standardize PHY testing for multiple speed grades in order for the results from various test houses to be reliable and equivalent. TC13 is expected to produce methodology and specifications for qualification of test houses.

==== TC14 ====
Interoperability & Compliance Tests for 10BASE-T1S PHYs

The goal of TC14 is to define the test requirements and methods for 10BASE-T1S PHY, covering interoperability, standard compliance, and electromagnetic compatibility.

==== TC15 ====
TC 15 Committee is working on multi-gigabit automotive Ethernet interoperability and compliance tests.

==== TC16 ====
TC16 Committee is working on interoperability and standard compliance for use of Energy-Efficient Ethernet in the automotive environment.

==== TC17 ====
MACsec Automotive Profile

The goal of TC17 is adapting the IEEE 802.1AE (MACsec) standard to the automotive applications, including the shared-media PHY 10BASE-T1S.

As of 2023 it is co-chaired by BMW - Oliver Creighton and Ford - John Moore

== Licensing ==
Companies/Members wanting to implement the non-OPEN Alliance specifications 100BASE-T1, 1000BASE-T1 or 1000BASE-RH, have to obtain the respective licenses based on the IEEE IPR Policy.
