= IEEE 802.1 =

Set of IEEE standards relating to data networking

IEEE 802.1 is a working group of the IEEE 802 project of the IEEE Standards Association.

It is concerned with:

- 802 LAN/MAN architecture
- internetworking among 802 LANs, MANs and wide area networks
- 802 Link Security
- 802 overall network management
- protocol layers above the MAC and LLC layers

== IEEE 802.1 standards ==
Standard	Description	Status
=== 802.1B ===
802.1B-1992	LAN/MAN Management	Withdrawn in 2004
802.1k-1993	Discovery and Dynamic Control of Event Forwarding (Amendment to 802.1B-1992)	Withdrawn in 2004
=== 802.1D ===
802.1D-1990	MAC Bridges	Superseded by 802.1D-1998
802.1i-1995	FDDI bridging (see ANSI X3T9.5)	Superseded
802.1j-1996	Managed objects for MAC Bridges	Superseded by 802.1D-1998
P802.1p	Traffic Class Expediting and Dynamic Multicast Filtering	Merged into 802.1D-1998
802.1D-1998	MAC Bridges (rollup of 802.1D-1990, 802.1j, 802.6k, P802.12e and P802.1p)	Superseded by 802.1D-2004
P802.1r	GARP Proprietary Attribute Registration Protocol (GPRP)	Withdrawn
802.1t-2001	Technical and Editorial corrections for 802.1D-1998	Incorporated into 802.1D-2004
802.1w-2001	Rapid Reconfiguration of Spanning Tree	Incorporated into 802.1D-2004
P802.1y	Maintenance to 802.1D-1998	Merged into 802.1D-2004
802.1D-2004	MAC Bridges (rollup of 802.1D-1998, 802.1t, 802.1w, P802.1y, and 802.11c)	Incorporated into 802.1Q-2014
=== 802.1E ===
802.1E-1990	System Load Protocol	Withdrawn in 2004
802.1m-1993	Managed objects for System Load Protocol (Amendment to 802.1E-1990)	Withdrawn in 2004
=== 802.1F ===
802.1F-1993	Common Definitions and Procedures for IEEE 802 Management Information	Withdrawn in 2009
=== 802.1G ===
802.1G-1996	Remote MAC Bridging	Withdrawn in 2009
=== 802.1H ===
802.1H-1995	Ethernet MAC Bridging	Withdrawn in 2011
=== 802.1Q ===
802.1Q-1998	Virtual Bridged Local Area Networks	Superseded by 802.1Q-2003
802.1v-2001	VLAN Classification by Protocol and Port	Incorporated into 802.1Q-2003
802.1u-2001	Technical and Editorial corrections for 802.1Q-1998	Incorporated into 802.1Q-2003
802.1s-2002	Multiple Spanning Tree Protocol	Incorporated into 802.1Q-2003
802.1Q-2003	Virtual Bridged Local Area Networks (Rollup of 802.1Q-1998, 802.1s, 802.1u and 802.1v)	Superseded by 802.1Q-2005
P802.1z	Maintenance to 802.1Q-2003	Merged into 802.1Q-2005
802.1Q-2005	Virtual Bridged Local Area Networks (Rollup of 802.1Q-2003 and P802.1z)	Superseded by 802.1Q-2011
802.1ad-2005	Provider Bridging	Incorporated into 802.1Q-2011
802.1ak-2007	Replace GARP with Multiple Registration Protocol (MRP), MVRP and MMRP.	Incorporated into 802.1Q-2011
802.1ag-2007	Connectivity Fault Management	Incorporated into 802.1Q-2011
802.1ah-2008	Provider Backbone Bridge (PBB)	Incorporated into 802.1Q-2011
802.1Q-2005/Cor 1-2008	Technical corrections for Multiple Registration Protocol	Incorporated into 802.1Q-2011
802.1ap-2008	Management Information Base (MIB) definitions for VLAN Bridges	Incorporated into 802.1Q-2011
802.1aj-2009	Two Port MAC Relay (TPMR)	Incorporated into 802.1Q-2011
802.1Qav-2009	Forwarding and Queuing Enhancements for Time-sensitive Streams	Incorporated into 802.1Q-2011
802.1Qaw-2009	Management of Data-Driven and Data-Dependent Connectivity Faults	Incorporated into 802.1Q-2011
802.1Qay-2009	Provider Backbone Bridge Traffic Engineering (PBB-TE)	Incorporated into 802.1Q-2011
802.1Qat-2010	Stream Reservation Protocol (SRP) (includes Multiple Stream Registration Protocol (MSRP))	Incorporated into 802.1Q-2011
802.1Qau-2010	Congestion Management	Incorporated into 802.1Q-2011
802.1Q-2011	Media Access Control (MAC) Bridges and Virtual Bridged Local Area Networks (Rollup of 802.1Q-2005+Cor-1 and 802.1ad/ag/ah/aj/ak/ap/Qat/Qav/Qaw/Qay/Qau)	Superseded by 802.1Q-2014
802.1Qaz-2011	Enhanced Transmission Selection for Bandwidth Sharing Between Traffic Classes	Incorporated into 802.1Q-2014
802.1Qbb-2011	Priority-based Flow Control	Incorporated into 802.1Q-2014
802.1Qbc-2011	Provider Bridging — Remote Customer Service Interface	Incorporated into 802.1Q-2014
802.1Qbe-2011	Multiple Backbone Service Instance Identifier (I-SID) Registration Protocol (MIRP)	Incorporated into 802.1Q-2014
802.1Qbf-2011	PBB-TE Infrastructure Segment Protection	Incorporated into 802.1Q-2014
802.1aq-2012	Shortest Path Bridging (SPB)	Incorporated into 802.1Q-2014
802.1Qbg-2012	Edge Virtual Bridging	Incorporated into 802.1Q-2014
802.1Q-2011/Cor 2-2012	Minor technical and editorial fixes to 802.1Q-2011	Incorporated into 802.1Q-2014
P802.1Qbh	Bridge port Extension / VN-Tag	Merged into 802.1BR-2012
802.1Qbp-2014	Equal Cost Multiple Paths (for Shortest Path Bridging)	Incorporated into 802.1Q-2014
802.1Q-2014	Bridges and Bridged Networks (Rollup of 802.1Q-2011+Cor2 and 802.1Qbe/Qbc/Qbb/Qaz/Qbf/Qbg/Qaq & functionality specified in 802.1D)	Superseded by 802.1Q-2018
802.1Q-2014/Cor 1-2015	Minor technical and editorial fixes to 802.1Q-2014	Incorporated into 802.1Q-2018
802.1Qbv-2015	Enhancements for Scheduled Traffic	Incorporated into 802.1Q-2018
802.1Qca-2015	Path Control and Reservation	Incorporated into 802.1Q-2018
802.1Qcd-2015	Application Virtual Local Area Network (VLAN) Type, Length, Value (TLV) (Data Center Bridging eXchange (DCBX) protocol application-specific TLVs)	Incorporated into 802.1Q-2018
802.1Qbu-2016	Frame Preemption	Incorporated into 802.1Q-2018
802.1Qbz-2016	Enhancements to Bridging of 802.11 Media	Incorporated into 802.1Q-2018
802.1Qch-2017	Cyclic Queuing and Forwarding	Incorporated into 802.1Q-2018
802.1Qci-2017	Per-Stream Filtering and Policing	Incorporated into 802.1Q-2018
802.1Q-2018	Bridges and Bridged Networks (Rollup of 802.1Q-2014+Cor1 and 802.1Qca/Qcd/Qbu/Qbv/Qbz/Qch/Qci)	Superseded by 802.1Q-2022
802.1Qcc-2018	Stream Reservation Protocol (SRP) Enhancements and Performance Improvements	Incorporated into 802.1Q-2022
802.1Qcp-2018	YANG Data Model	Incorporated into 802.1Q-2022
802.1Qcy-2019	Virtual Station Interface (VSI) Discovery and Configuration Protocol (VDP)	Incorporated into 802.1Q-2022
802.1Qcr-2020	Bridges and Bridged Networks: Asynchronous Traffic Shaping	Incorporated into 802.1Q-2022
802.1Qcx-2020	YANG Data Model for Connectivity Fault Management	Incorporated into 802.1Q-2022
802.1Q-2022	Bridges and Bridged Networks (Rollup of 802.1Qcc/Qcy/Qcr)	Current
802.1Qcj-2023	Automatic Attachment to Provider Backbone Bridging (PBB) services	Current
802.1Qcw-2023	YANG Data Models for Scheduled Traffic, Frame Preemption, and Per-Stream Filtering and Policing	Current
802.1Qcz-2023	Congestion Isolation	Current
802.1Qdj-2024	Configuration Enhancements for Time-Sensitive Networking	Current
802.1Qdq	Shaper Parameter Settings for Bursty Traffic Requiring Bounded Latency	in progress
802.1Qdt	Priority-based Flow Control Enhancements	in progress
802.1Qdv	Enhancements to Cyclic Queuing and Forwarding	in progress
802.1Qdw	Source Flow Control	in progress
802.1Qdx	YANG Data Models for the Credit-Based Shaper	in progress
802.1Qdy	YANG for the Multiple Spanning Tree Protocol	in progress
802.1Q-Rev	Bridges and Bridged Networks (Roll-up of 802.1Qcj/Qcz/Qcw)	in progress
=== 802.1X ===
802.1X-2001	Port Based Network Access Control	Superseded by 802.1X-2004
P802.1aa	Maintenance to 802.1X-2001	Merged into 802.1X-2004
802.1X-2004	Port Based Network Access Control (Rollup of 802.1X-2001 and P802.1aa)	Incorporated into 802.1Q-2005
P802.1af	Media Access Control (MAC) Key Security	Merged into 802.1X-2010
802.1X-2010	Port Based Network Access Control	Superseded by 802.1X-2020
802.1Xbx-2014	MAC Security Key Agreement protocol (MKA) extensions	Incorporated into 802.1X-2020
802.1Xck-2018	Port-Based Network Access Control: YANG Data Model	Incorporated into 802.1X-2020
802.1X-2020/Cor 1	Port-Based Network Access Control	Current
802.1X-Rev	Port-Based Network Access Control	in progress
=== 802.1AB ===
802.1AB-2005	Station and Media Access Control Connectivity Discovery (LLDP)	Superseded by 802.1AB-2009
802.1AB-2009	Station and Media Access Control Connectivity Discovery (LLDP)	Superseded by 802.1AB-2016
802.1AB-2009/Cor 1-2013	Technical corrections for Station and Media Access Control Connectivity Discovery (LLDP)	Incorporated into 802.1AB-2016
802.1AB-2009/Cor 2-2015	Technical corrections for Station and Media Access Control Connectivity Discovery (LLDP)	Incorporated into 802.1AB-2016
802.1AB-2016	Station and Media Access Control Connectivity Discovery (LLDP)	Current
802.1ABcu-2021	LLDP YANG Data Model	Current
802.1ABdh-2021	LLDP Support for Multiframe Protocol Data Units (LLDPv2)	Current
802.1AB-Rev	Station and Media Access Control Connectivity Discovery (LLDP)	in progress
=== 802.1AC ===
802.1AC-2012	Media Access Control (MAC) Services Definition (from 802.1D and 802.1Q)	Superseded by 802.1AC-2016
802.1AC-2016	Media Access Control (MAC) Services Definition	Current
802.1AC-2016/Cor 1-2018	Logical Link Control (LLC) Encapsulation EtherType	Current
802.1ACct-2021	Support for IEEE 802.15.3	Current
802.1ACea	MAC Service Definition Amendment: Support for IEEE 802.15.6	in progress
802.1AC-Rev	Media Access Control (MAC) Services Definition	in progress
=== 802.1AE ===
802.1AE-2006	MAC Security	Superseded by 802.1AE-2018
802.1AEbn-2011	Galois Counter Mode-Advanced Encryption Standard-256 (GCM-AES-256) Cipher Suite	Incorporated into 802.1AE-2018
802.1AEbw-2013	Extended Packet Numbering	Incorporated into 802.1AE-2018
802.1AEcg-2017	Ethernet Data Encryption devices	Incorporated into 802.1AE-2018
802.1AE-2018	MAC Security (MACsec)	Current
802.1AEdk	Media Access Control (MAC) Security — MAC Privacy protection	in progress
802.1AE-Rev	MAC Security	in progress
=== 802.1AR ===
802.1AR-2009	Secure Device Identity (DevID)	Superseded by 802.1AR-2018
P802.1ARce	SHA–384 and P–384 Elliptic Curve	Merged into 802.1AR-2018
802.1AR-2018	Secure Device Identity (DevID)	Current
=== 802.1AS ===
802.1AS-2011	Timing and Synchronization for Time-Sensitive Applications in Bridged Local Area Networks.	Superseded by 802.1AS-2020
802.1AS-2011/Cor 1-2013	Technical and editorial corrections	Incorporated into 802.1AS-2020
802.1AS-2011/Cor 2-2015	Technical and editorial corrections	Incorporated into 802.1AS-2020
P802.1ASbt	Enhancements and performance improvements	Merged into 802.1AS-2020
802.1AS-2020	Timing and Synchronization for Time-Sensitive Applications	Current
802.1AS-2020/Cor 1-2021	Technical and Editorial Corrections	Current
802.1ASdm-2024	Timing and Synchronization for Time-Sensitive Applications — Hot Standby	Current
802.1ASdn	Timing and Synchronization for Time-Sensitive Applications — YANG Data Model	in progress
802.1ASds	Support for the IEEE Std 802.3 Clause 4 Media Access Control (MAC) operating in half-duplex	in progress
802.1ASeb	Optional Use of Announce	in progress
802.1ASed-2026	Fault-Tolerant Timing with Time Integrity	Current
802.1AS-rev	Timing and Synchronization for Time-Sensitive Applications	in progress
=== 802.1AX ===
802.1AX-2008	Link Aggregation (Initially created as 802.3ad-2000)	Superseded by 802.1AX-2014
802.1AXbk	Add support for Provider Bridged Networks and two-port MAC relays to Link Aggregation	Incorporated into 802.1AX-2014
802.1AXbq	Distributed Resilient Network Interconnect	Incorporated into 802.1AX-2014
802.1AX-2014	Rollup of 802.1AX, AXbk and AXbq amendments.	Superseded by 802.1AX-2020
802.1AX-2014/Cor 1-2017	Technical and editorial corrections	Incorporated into 802.1AX-2020
802.1AX-2020	Link Aggregation	Current
802.1AXdz-2025	YANG for Link Aggregation	Current
=== 802.1BA ===
802.1BA-2011	Audio Video Bridging (AVB) Systems	Superseded by 802.1BA-2021
802.1BA-2011/Cor 1-2016	Technical and editorial corrections	Incorporated into 802.1BA-2021
802.1BA-2021	TSN profile for Audio Video Bridging (AVB) Systems	Current
=== 802.1BR ===
802.1BR-2012	Bridge Port Extension (VN-Tag)(incorporates work from P802.1Qbh)	Current
=== 802.1CB ===
802.1CB-2017	Frame Replication and Elimination for Reliability	Current
802.1CBcv-2021	YANG Data Model and Management Information Base Module	Current
802.1CBdb-2021	Extended Stream Identification Functions	Current
802.1CB-2017/Cor 1	Frame Replication and Elimination for Reliability – Corrigendum 1	in progress
=== 802.1CF ===
802.1CF	Network Reference Model and Functional Description of IEEE 802 Access Network	in progress
=== 802.1CM ===
802.1CM-2018	Time-Sensitive Networking for Fronthaul	Current
802.1CMde-2020	Enhancements to Fronthaul Profiles to Support New Fronthaul Interface, Synchronization, and Syntonization Standards	Current
=== 802.1CS ===
802.1CS-2020	Link-local Registration Protocol	Current
=== 802.1CQ ===
802.1CQ	Multicast and Local Address Assignment	in progress
=== 802.1DC ===
802.1DC-2024	Quality of Service Provision by Network Systems	Current
=== 802.1DD ===
802.1DD	Resource Allocation Protocol	in progress
=== 802.1DF ===
802.1DF	TSN Profile for Service Provider Networks	in progress
=== 802.1DG ===
802.1DG-2025	TSN Profile for Automotive In-Vehicle Ethernet Communications	Current
=== 802.1DP ===
802.1DP-2025 / SAE AS 6675	TSN Profile for Aerospace Onboard Ethernet Communications	Current
=== 802.1DU ===
802.1DU	Cut-Through Forwarding Bridges and Bridged Networks	in progress

The IEEE 802 LAN/MAN Standards Committee makes current standards freely available, after a six-month delay, through their Get IEEE 802.1 program.

Other recent 802.1 standards are available through the IEEE for a fee.
