= University of New Hampshire InterOperability Laboratory =

Independent test facility

- Type: Private
- Industry: Computer networking
- Founded: 1988
- Headquarters: Durham, New Hampshire, U.S.
- Number of employees: 100+
- Website: iol.unh.edu

The University of New Hampshire InterOperability Laboratory (UNH-IOL) is an independent test organization that provides interoperability and standards conformance testing for networking, telecommunications, data storage, and consumer technology products.

Founded in 1988, it employs approximately 25 full-time staff members and over 100 part-time undergraduate and graduate students, and counts over 150 companies as members.

== History ==
The UNH-IOL began as a project of the University's Research Computing Center (RCC). In 1988 the RCC was testing Fiber Distributed Data Interface (FDDI) equipment with the intention of deploying it in its network. The RCC found that equipment from two vendors did not work together and contacted the vendors to find a solution. The two vendors cooperated with the RCC to solve the problem which was caused by differences between the draft and final FDDI specification. During this same time period the RCC was testing 10BASE-T Ethernet interfaces for another project.

The University recognized the need for interoperability testing of networking equipment and also the opportunity to provide students with hands-on experience in emerging technologies. With the idea of providing testing services to companies in a vendor-neutral environment the first UNH-IOL consortium (10BASE-T Ethernet) was founded in 1990.

Over the next decade the UNH-IOL grew to twelve consortia with over 100 member companies. In 2002, having outgrown several smaller locations, the UNH-IOL moved to a 32,000 square foot facility on the outskirts of the UNH campus.

One area in which the UNH-IOL has been influential is IPv6 standardization and deployment. Between 2003 and 2007 the UNH-IOL organized the Moonv6 project, which was a multi-site, IPv6 based network designed to test the interoperability of IPv6 implementations. At the time the Moonv6 project was the largest permanently deployed multi-vendor IPv6 network in the world. The UNH-IOL is also the only North American laboratory offering ISO/IEC 17025 accredited testing designed specifically for the USGv6 Test Program.

The UNH-IOL is also known for organizing and hosting plugfests for a number of industry trade organizations. The lab has hosted plugfests for the Broadband Forum, NVM Express, SCSI Trade Association, Ethernet Alliance, and the Open Compute Project, among others.

In 2013 the UNH-IOL was awarded the IEEE-SA Corporate Award "for outstanding corporate leadership and contribution to IEEE-SA".

In January 2016 the lab moved to a new 28,000 square foot location adjacent to the main UNH campus in Durham, NH.

== Consortia ==
The UNH-IOL operates testing programs on an annual membership basis called consortia. Each consortium is a collaboration between equipment vendors, test equipment manufacturers, industry forums, and the UNH-IOL in a particular technology. The collaborative testing model is intended to distribute the costs associated with maintaining a high-quality testing program among the consortium members.

The UNH-IOL currently administers consortia in over 20 different technologies, including:

- Internetworking Protocols: IPv6, Routing and SDN, RTC and VoIP, DLNA, RVU, TR-069
- Data Center: Open Compute Project testing, iSCSI, Fibre Channel, NVMe, Data center bridging, OpenFabrics Alliance
- Embedded Systems: AVnu, Precision Time Protocol, BroadR-Reach (Automotive Ethernet)
- Broadband Systems: DSL, G.fast, Power over Ethernet, Wireless LAN, Open Platform for NFV
- Baseband Systems: MIPI, Serial ATA, Serial attached SCSI, PCI Express, 40/100 Gigabit Ethernet, 10 Gigabit Ethernet, Backplane Ethernet, Gigabit Ethernet, Fast Ethernet
