= SLPP =

SLPP may refer to:

- Sierra Leone People's Party
- Sri Lanka Podujana Peramuna (also known as Sri Lanka People's Front), a political party in Sri Lanka
- Simple Loop Prevention Protocol (Nortel) (see Avaya Simple Loop Prevention Protocol)
