= IEC 61883 =

International standard

IEC 61883 Consumer Audio/Video Equipment - Digital Interface is a technical standard for a digital interface that is used by IEEE 1394 (FireWire) devices for audio and video equipment. The standard for these devices is maintained by the International Electrotechnical Commission. The first part was released in 1998; the current third edition is dated 2008.

== Parts ==
61883-1
General

61883-2
SD-DVCR data transmission

61883-3
HD-DVCR data transmission

61883-4
MPEG2-TS data transmission

61883-5
SDL-DVCR data transmission

61883-6
Audio and music data transmission

61883-7
Transmission of ITU-R BO.1294 System B

61883-8
Transmission of ITU-R BT.601 style digital video data

== Sources ==
- Kim, Il-Jung; Yang, Soo-Kyung; Rhee, Seung Hak; Choy, Ik Soo; Park, Jong-An (2002). "IEC 61883 and AV/C CTS-based IEEE 1394 digital home appliances control". Proceedings of the International Society for Optical Engineering. Media Processors. pp. 133–140. Bibcode:2001SPIE.4674..133K. doi:10.1117/12.451068.
- "IEC 61883-1", "IEC 61883-2", "IEC 61883-3", "IEC 61883-4", "IEC 61883-5", "IEC 61883-6", "IEC 61883-7", "IEC 61883-8" at International Electrotechnical Commission
