= Admission control =

Validation process for connections in communication systems

Admission control is a validation process in communication systems where a check is performed before a connection is established to see if current resources are sufficient for the proposed connection.

== Applications ==
For some applications, dedicated resources (such as a wavelength across an optical network) may be needed in which case admission control has to verify availability of such resources before a request can be admitted.

For more elastic applications, a total volume of resources may be needed prior to some deadline in order to satisfy a new request, in which case admission control needs to verify availability of resources at the time and perform scheduling to guarantee satisfaction of an admitted request.

== Admission control systems ==
- Asynchronous Transfer Mode
- Audio Video Bridging using Stream Reservation Protocol
- Call admission control
- IEEE 1394
- Integrated services on IP networks
- Public switched telephone network
