= BroadR-Reach =

Ethernet standard

BroadR-Reach (later also known as OPEN Alliance BroadR-Reach or OABR) technology is an Ethernet physical layer standard designed for automotive connectivity applications. BroadR-Reach allows multiple in-vehicle systems to simultaneously access information over unshielded single twisted pair cable. BroadR-Reach was invented and is promoted by Broadcom Corporation, now Broadcom Limited.

== Networks ==
Using BroadR-Reach technology in automotive enables the migration from multiple closed applications to an open Ethernet-based network. This allows automotive manufacturers to incorporate multiple electronic systems and devices, such as advanced safety features (i.e. 360-degree surround view parking assistance, rear-view cameras and collision avoidance systems) and comfort and infotainment features. The automotive-qualified BroadR-Reach Ethernet physical layer standard can be combined with IEEE 802.3 compliant switch technology to deliver 100 Mbit/s over unshielded single twisted pair cable. This innovation bypasses traditional cabling for Ethernet connectivity, allowing all vehicle components to connect using wires that are lighter and more cost effective.

== Physical layer ==
The BroadR-Reach automotive Ethernet standard realizes simultaneous transmit and receive (i.e., full-duplex) operations on a single-pair cable. In order to better de-correlate the signals, the digital signal processor (DSP) uses a highly optimized scrambler when compared to the scrambler used in 100BASE-TX. This provides a robust and efficient signaling scheme required by automotive applications. The BroadR-Reach automotive Ethernet standard uses a signaling scheme with higher spectral efficiency than that of 100BASE-TX. This limits the signal bandwidth of Automotive Ethernet to 33.3 MHz, which is about half the bandwidth of 100BASE-TX. A lower signal bandwidth improves return loss, reduces crosstalk, and ensures that BroadR-Reach automotive Ethernet standard passes the stringent automotive electromagnetic emission requirements.

== Standardization ==
The OPEN Alliance SIG is a special interest group formed by BMW, Broadcom, Freescale, Harman, Hyundai, NXP and STMicroelectronics to establish BroadR-Reach as an open standard and to encourage wide scale adoption of automotive Ethernet as the connectivity standard in automotive networking applications. Since its inception in late 2011, membership has reached more than 300 members as of 22 March 2016.

IEEE 802.3 standardized 100BASE-T1 in IEEE 802.3bw-2015 Clause 96.

== Licensing ==
The BroadR-Reach automotive Ethernet standard was officially released in December 2011, following the formation of The OPEN (One-Pair Ether-Net) Alliance Special Interest Group (SIG) (OPEN Alliance SIG). License to the specification for BroadR-Reach is available to all interested OPEN Alliance SIG members under RAND terms via a license from Broadcom Corporation.
