= Simple Loop Prevention Protocol =

Protocol developed by Nortel to protect against Layer 2 network loops

Simple Loop Prevention Protocol (SLPP) in computer networking is a data link layer protocol developed by Nortel (previously acquired by Avaya, now a part of Extreme Networks) to protect against Layer 2 network loops. SLPP uses a small hello packet to detect network loops. The SLPP protocol checks packets from the originating switch and the peer switch in a SMLT configuration. Sending hello packets on a per VLAN basis allows SLPP to detect VLAN based network loops for un-tagged, as well as tagged IEEE 802.1Q VLAN link configurations. If a loop is detected, the associated port is shut down.

== Compatible equipment ==
- Avaya VSP 9000 Series - Software version 3.0 or above
- Avaya VSP 7000 Series - Software version 10.0 or above
- Avaya ERS 8600 - Software version 4.1 or above
- Avaya ERS-8300 - Software version 4.0 or above
- Avaya ERS-5000 - Software version 6.3 or above
- Avaya ERS 4000 series - Software version 5.6.2 or above
- Avaya ERS-3500 - Software version 5.2.0 or above

== See also ==
- VLACP
