= Ethernet over PDH =

Ethernet over legacy telecomminucations infrastructure

Ethernet over PDH or EoPDH is one of many techniques that provide Ethernet connectivity over non-Ethernet networks. Specifically, EoPDH is a standardized methodology for transporting native Ethernet frames over the existing telecommunications copper infrastructure by leveraging the established PDH transport technology. EoPDH is one of several Ethernet transport technologies that enables Telecommunication Service Providers to offer "Carrier Ethernet" services. It is also commonly used as a means of connecting businesses to a Metro Ethernet network.

EoPDH is based on a collection of technologies and standards that allow telecommunications Carriers to make use of their extensive networks of legacy PDH and SONET/SDH (Synchronous Digital Hierarchy) equipment to provide new Ethernet services. In addition, the collection of EoPDH standards provide for interoperability and the gradual migration of Carriers to an Ethernet network.

== General Description ==
EoPDH is a standardized methodology for transporting native Ethernet frames over PDH links such as T1, E1, or DS3. The technologies used in EoPDH include GFP frame encapsulation, Ethernet Mapping, Virtual Concatenation, Link Capacity Adjustment Scheme, and Management Messaging. Common practices in EoPDH equipment also include the tagging of traffic for separation into virtual networks, prioritization of user traffic, and a broad range of higher-layer applications such as DHCP servers and HTML user interfaces.

== Related Standards ==
Standards from the ITU-T:

- ITU-T G.7041 Generic Framing Procedure
- ITU-T G.7042 Link Capacity Adjustment Scheme
- ITU-T G.7043 Virtual concatenation of plesiochronous digital hierarchy (PDH) signals
- ITU-T G.8040 GFP frame mapping into Plesiochronous Digital Hierarchy (PDH)
- ITU-T Y.1730 Requirements for OAM functions
- ITU-T Y.1731 OAM functions and mechanisms

== See also ==
- Ethernet over SONET and Ethernet over SDH
- Ethernet over PDH over SONET/SDH
- Packet over SONET/SDH
- Metro Ethernet
