= Ethernet over PDH over SONET/SDH =

Aspect of Ethernet networking

Ethernet over PDH over SONET/SDH (EoPoS) is one of many techniques that provided Ethernet connectivity over non-Ethernet networks. EoPoS is a standardized method for transporting native Ethernet frames over the existing telecommunications optical infrastructure use both the established Plesiochronous Digital Hierarchy (PDH) and Synchronous Digital Hierarchy (SONET/SDH) transport technologies.

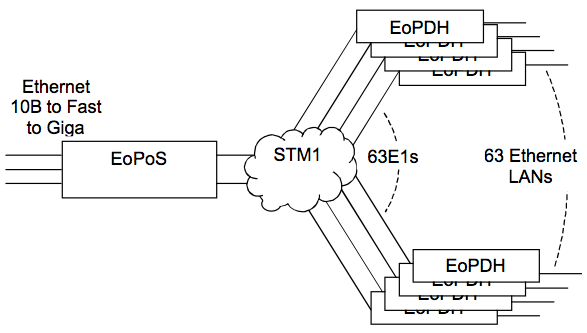
Application of EoPoS

== Description ==
EoPoS is a standardized method for transporting native Ethernet frames over a SONET/SDH network, by first mapping into one or more PDH tributaries such as T1, E1, or DS3. The tributaries can then be dropped from a legacy ADM, delivered to the customer premises, and the PDH links resolved back to an Ethernet connection by a piece of equipment supporting EoPDH.

The technologies used in EoPoS include GFP frame encapsulation, Ethernet Mapping, Virtual Concatenation, Link Capacity Adjustment Scheme, and Management Messaging (OAM). Common practices in EoPoS equipment also include the tagging of traffic for separation into virtual networks, prioritization of user traffic.

Standards from the ITU-T include:

- ITU-T G.7041 Generic Framing Procedure
- ITU-T G.7042 Link Capacity Adjustment Scheme
- ITU-T G.7043 Virtual concatenation of plesiochronous digital hierarchy (PDH) signals
- ITU-T G.8040 GFP frame mapping into Plesiochronous Digital Hierarchy (PDH)
- ITU-T Y.1730 Requirements for OAM functions
- ITU-T Y.1731 OAM functions and mechanisms

== Use ==
By first mapping into one or more PDH tributaries such as T1, E1, or DS3, the component Ethernet contained in separate PDH signals from a central location can be fanned out to multiple locations. EoPoS allows transport of native Ethernet frames over a SONET/SDH network. Then the component PDH can then be separately dropped using a legacy add-drop multiplexer. Finally, the PDH links are resolved back to Ethernet connections by equipment supporting EoPDH. For proper operation each of the virtual local area network must be individually tagged using IEEE 802.1Q for example.

== See also ==
- Ethernet over PDH
- Ethernet over SONET and Ethernet over SDH
- Packet over SONET/SDH
