= SoftAP =

SoftAP is an abbreviated term for "software enabled access point". Such access points utilize software to enable a computer which hasn't been specifically made to be a router into a wireless access point. It is often used interchangeably with the term "virtual router".

== History on Windows ==
The first SoftAP software was shipped by Ralink with their Wi-Fi cards for Windows XP. It enabled a Wi-Fi card to act as a wireless access point. While a card was acting as a wireless access point, it could not continue to stay connected as a client, so any Internet access had to come from another device, such as an Ethernet device. Following Ralink's card innovation, a number of other Wi-Fi vendors, including Edimax, later released SoftAP software for their devices. Neither Ralink nor Edimax updated their software to work with Windows Vista, due to the installation of its new driver model, bringing an effective end to this software category until the release of Windows 7 in 2009.

Windows gained the ability to natively create software access points with the release of Windows 7 through a virtual Wi-Fi adapter, allowing a network card to function both as a station and access point. This functionality was only exposed through the netsh CLI, indicating that it was unfinished. Upon the release of Windows 10, a user interface to create hotspots was added.

== Purpose ==
SoftAP is a common method of configuring Wi-Fi products without a display or input device, such as a Wi-Fi enabled appliance, home security camera, smart home product or any other IoT device. The process typically involves these steps:

1. The headless device turns on a SoftAP Wi-Fi hotspot.
2. The user downloads a product-specific app on a smartphone, and the app then either uses the underlying Android or iOS operating system to connect to the SoftAP hotspot, or directs the user to connect the phone manually.
3. The app then asks the user for the user's private Wi-Fi network name (SSID) and passkey
4. The app sends the SSID and passkey to the headless device over the SoftAP connection.
5. The headless device then falls off the SoftAP network and joins the user's private Wi-Fi network.

This process can work well, but there are two core problems. First, the process often requires the user to manually connect to the SoftAP network, which can be confusing for mainstream users. Second, if the user enters the passkey incorrectly, or if the phone gets disconnected from the SoftAP network for any reason, it is difficult for the app and device to smoothly recover, so the user is often left having to factory reset the device and start over. Third, different phones (hardware and OS versions) handle SoftAP differently, so the user experience varies dramatically—especially with the wide variety of Android hardware and software.

Because of these complexities, many companies making Wi-Fi connected products are now adding BLE, ZipKey, data-over-sound, or another technology to facilitate a better out-of-box experience for users.

== Platform support ==
Various operating system platforms support SoftAP, including:

- Linux
- Windows 7
- Windows 8
- Windows 10
- Windows 11
- Android
- Windows Phone 7.5
- Windows Phone 8
- Windows 10 Mobile
- iOS
- Mac OS

== Commercial vendors ==
- Connectify
- Edimax
- Ralink

== See also ==
- Wi-Fi Direct
- Connectify
