= University residence hall network =

A residence hall network, or ResNet (also Resnet or ResNET, or other variations), is a local area network (LAN) or a metropolitan area network (MAN) provided by a university that serves the personal computers of students in their residence halls or dormitory buildings. ResNet may also refer to the department that administers such a network or the services provided via the network. A ResNet usually allows students to connect to a university's intranet with (possibly limited) access to the public Internet. ResNet is essentially the ISP for students residing in campus-managed housing.

== Administration ==
The department, organization, or group responsible for maintenance of and support for the residential computer network is often also known as ResNet. This group may be an independent department in the central Information Technology division, the Housing department, or some other division or department. ResNet responsibilities may also lie not with a group dedicated to ResNet but may be one of many responsibilities such as those commonly held by help desks.

== Services ==
The functions of such a department vary greatly between campuses. Most, at least, provide assistance in connecting to the school's network. Other services may include the removal of viruses, adware, spyware, greyware, and malware, as well as services ranging from operating system or software and hardware advice to data recovery.

ResNet is slowly evolving into a full-blown computer Help Desk on many campuses, and in some cases has merged into a single support group for staff, faculty, and students.

Some ResNet organizations have branched from computer only support to alternate devices such as smartphones, PDAs, and gaming devices.

== The ResNet organization ==
Conceived in 1992, ResNet is an international organization providing a forum for discussion, collaboration, and development for IT professionals in higher education. Students, faculty, staff, and vendors participate in ResNet both through the ResNet Listserv and by attending the annual Student Technology Conference. The ResNet organization is dedicated to the research and advancement of student technologies and services and their use in higher education. The organization oversees the annual Student Technology Conference (and a related Professional Development Seminar), hosted by a member school.

The ResNet organization has evolved from its simple roots during an informal discussion at Educom, into an internationally recognized professional organization engaging in dialogue, collaboration with vendors and other professional organizations, and professional development. Via its research entity, the ResNet Applied Research Group (RARG), ResNet has contributed to the international higher education community by conducting and publishing original research on networking technologies, music and entertainment, security, and technology support.

The annual Student Technology Conference is held on the campus of a selected host institution. Among the institutions that have hosted the symposium are Stanford University, which hosted the first ResNet Symposium in 1994, Wellesley College, Kent State University, Ferris State University, Princeton University and the Georgia Institute of Technology. The Student Technology Conference is the only conference of its kind which deals exclusively with student technologies within academic institutions. Content in recent conferences has focused on collaboration between these living and learning environments, institutional academic offerings, and the future directions of technology and services. Many aspects of such services are addressed through case studies, topic presentations, focus group dialog, birds of a feather discussions, vendor participation, etc.

For ResNet 2000, conducted at the University of Pennsylvania, a Pre-Conference Tutorial Content (PTC) was created to offer attendees a seminar style format that offered greater depth on topics. The PCT has since evolved into the Professional Development Seminar (PDS). The PDS offers attendees sessions on management of technical staff, staff development, advanced Malware detection and removal, and IT leadership.
