= Speedify =

Software-based channel bonding service

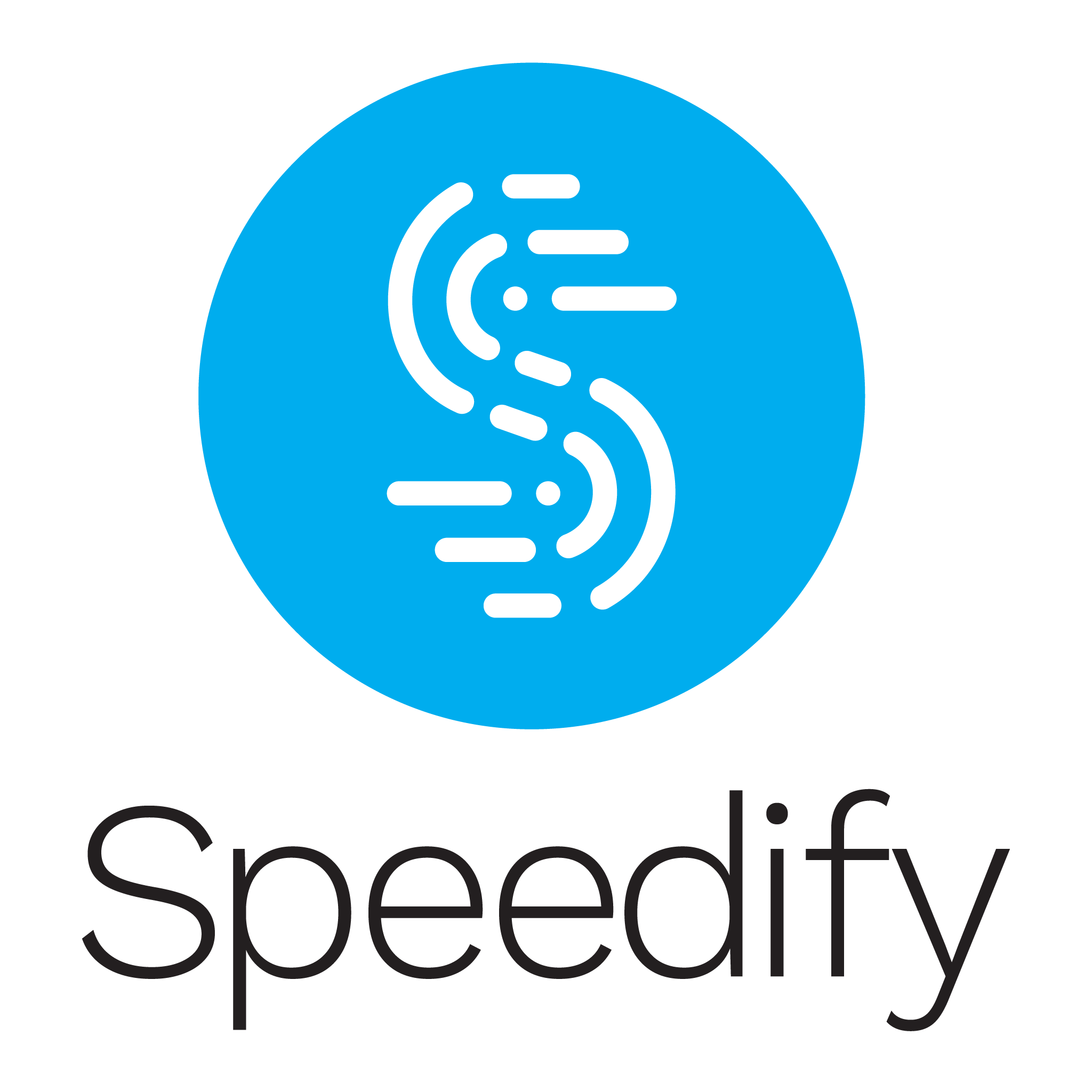
- Developer: Connectify
- Release: June 2014
- Stable release: v17.2 / September 2026
- Operating system: Windows, macOS, Linux, iOS, Android, OpenWrt
- Platform: PC, Smartphone, Tablet, Router, IoT
- Available in: English, Arabic, Simplified Chinese, French, German, Italian, Japanese, Korean, Norwegian, Polish, Portuguese, Romanian, Russian, Spanish, Swedish, Turkish, Ukrainian
- Type: Channel bonding software, VPN
- License: Proprietary
- Website: https://speedify.com
- Repository: https://github.com/speedify

Speedify is a software-based channel bonding service developed by Connectify Inc. Launched in 2014, Speedify enhances internet speed, reliability, and security by combining multiple internet connections at the same time into a single, faster, and more stable connection. It is available on various platforms, including Windows, macOS, Linux, iOS, Android and OpenWrt.

== Technology ==
=== Channel bonding ===
Compared to more traditional VPNs, Speedify's core technology is channel bonding, which allows users to utilize multiple internet connections simultaneously. This technique splits internet traffic at the packet level across available connections—such as Wi-Fi, cellular, Ethernet, and satellite—to increase bandwidth and provide redundancy. Unlike traditional load balancing, which distributes traffic based on sessions, channel bonding operates at a more granular level (network packet level), enhancing performance and reliability.

Speedify's implementation of channel bonding is software-based, enabling it to run on standard consumer devices without specialized hardware. The application interacts with Speedify's cloud servers to manage and distribute data packets across the combined connections.

Speedify also includes an automatic Internet failover mechanism. If one connection fluctuates or disconnects, Speedify can seamlessly reroute traffic to another connection source.

=== Protocols ===
The Speedify protocol is a proprietary, software-based solution operating at the packet level. It distributes data across various interfaces such as Wi-Fi, Ethernet, and 4G / 5G cellular networks, increasing bandwidth and providing redundancy. This approach ensures that if one connection experiences issues like packet loss or latency spikes, the others can compensate.

Unlike traditional VPN protocols like WireGuard, IPSec and OpenVPN, Speedify dynamically selects the optimal transport protocol—TCP, UDP, or HTTPS—based on current network conditions. This flexibility allows it to adapt to various scenarios, such as using multiple parallel TCP connections to maximize throughput on high-speed networks.

Comparatively, Multipath TCP (MPTCP) is an extension of the standard TCP protocol that enables the use of multiple paths for a single connection. While MPTCP can distribute traffic across different interfaces, it typically utilizes only one TCP socket per connection, limiting its ability to fully exploit multiple networks simultaneously. Additionally, MPTCP's performance can degrade in the presence of high latency or packet loss, as it is sensitive to such network variances.

=== Features ===
Speedify includes a cellular sharing feature called Pair & Share that allows users to share internet connections between nearby devices. The functionality is designed to enhance internet connectivity by enabling devices to bond not only their own internet interfaces—such as Wi-Fi, 4G / 5G cellular, or Ethernet—but also those of paired devices.

The feature works by allowing two or more Speedify-enabled devices in proximity to connect directly via a secure local link. Once paired, each device contributes its internet connections to the shared pool. This is useful in environments with limited bandwidth, such as during live streams, remote work sessions, or in disaster recovery scenarios where robust connectivity is critical.

Speedify’s proprietary network bonding protocol is used to encrypt and manage the shared traffic, ensuring that all data remains secure during transit.

== Performance and use cases ==
Independent reviews speak of Speedify in terms of getting stable and reliable internet in the context of live streaming, holding a steady latency and minimizing packet loss for Starlink connections. Miri Tech’s Powered by Speedify network bonding router was also used in a live stream with Kai Cenat and MrBeast, to provide uninterruptible internet access to an off-grid location.

== Service plans ==
=== Speedify for Individuals ===
Speedify offers individual plans that allow users to connect up to five devices simultaneously.

=== Speedify Families ===
Family plans extend Speedify's benefits to multiple users within a household, allowing family members to each have a Speedify account and use it on their devices.

=== Speedify for Business and Enterprise ===
Speedify's enterprise solutions cater to businesses, offering tools and services to manage and optimize internet connectivity.

==== Speedify Teams ====
Speedify Teams provides businesses with centralized account management through a dedicated dashboard, allowing administrators to manage billing, add or remove users, and monitor usage statistics. Additional features include centralized account management, CLI and API access.

==== Speedify for Routers ====
Speedify plans for supported routers running OpenWrt.

==== Powered by Speedify ====
Powered by Speedify refers to the integration of Speedify's technology into third-party hardware and software solutions. An example is the Miri X510 Bonding Router, which incorporates Speedify's channel bonding technology.

===== Speedify SDK =====
The Speedify SDK allows developers to integrate Speedify's channel bonding and VPN functionalities into their applications. It offers flexible deployment options, which allows the use of either the Speedify Cloud, dedicated managed servers, or self-hosted servers for network bonding.

===== Speedify Custom Engineering =====
Speedify also offers custom integration work, deployment architecture, and protocol-level customization.

== Add-ons ==
=== Speedify Dedicated Server ===
Private servers hosted by Speedify in locations around the world.

=== Speedify Self-Hosted Server ===
The option of running Speedify on a private server on any cloud provider or physical hardware.

Speedify's enterprise solutions have been adopted by various organizations:

For the Speedify SDK:

- Xfinity
- CUJO AI
- OmniAccess
- Cox Communications
- Comcast

For Powered by Speedify:

- MVD | Mobile Video Devices
- Magewell
- Miri Technologies
