= Bonding protocol =

Bonding many physical links to form one logical link

Bonding protocol (short for "Bandwidth On Demand Interoperability Group") is a generic name for a method of bonding or aggregation of multiple physical links to form a single logical link. Bonding is the term often used in Linux implementations: on Windows based systems the term teaming is often used, and between network-devices we talk about link aggregation, LAG and Link Aggregation Control Protocol.

== Major categories ==
- Asynchronous bonding protocol
- Synchronous bonding protocol

== See also ==
- Channel bonding
- Inverse multiplexer
- Link aggregation
