= Multilink =

Multilink may refer to:

- Multi-link suspension, a type of vehicle suspension design
- Multilink PPP, a type of communications protocol
- Multilink Procedure
- Multilink striping, a type of data striping used in telecommunications
