= Ethernet virtual connection =

An Ethernet virtual connection or Ethernet virtual circuit (EVC) defines a data link layer bridging architecture that supports Ethernet services. An EVC is defined by the Metro-Ethernet Forum (MEF) as an association between two or more user network interfaces that identifies a point-to-point or multipoint-to-multipoint path within the service provider network. An EVC is a conceptual service pipe within the service provider network. A bridge domain is a local broadcast domain that exists separately from VLANs.

== See also ==
- Carrier Ethernet
- Data link layer
- Ethernet
- Metro Ethernet
- Virtual circuit
- Virtual LAN
