= Infrastructure in Boston =

Below is information on the utility infrastructure in the city of Boston, Massachusetts.

== Electricity ==
Eversource Energy is the exclusive electricity distributor to the city, though due to deregulation, customers have a choice of electric generation companies. Natural gas is distributed by National Grid plc (originally KeySpan, the successor company to Boston Gas); only commercial and industrial customers may choose an alternate natural gas supplier.

== Steam heating ==
Municipal steam services are provided by Vicinity Energy, a spinoff of Veolia North America and its subsidiary Trigen Energy Corporation; which comprise the original assets of the defunct Boston Heating Company.

== Telecommunications ==
Verizon, successor to New England Telephone, NYNEX, Bell Atlantic, and earlier, the Bell System, is the primary wired telephone service provider for the area. Phone service is also available from various national wireless companies. Cable television is available from Comcast and RCN, with broadband Internet access provided by the same companies in certain areas. A variety of DSL providers and resellers are able to provide broadband Internet over Verizon-owned phone lines.

An independent Boston Internet Exchange is also located in Boston's financial distract on Summer Street.

== Water ==
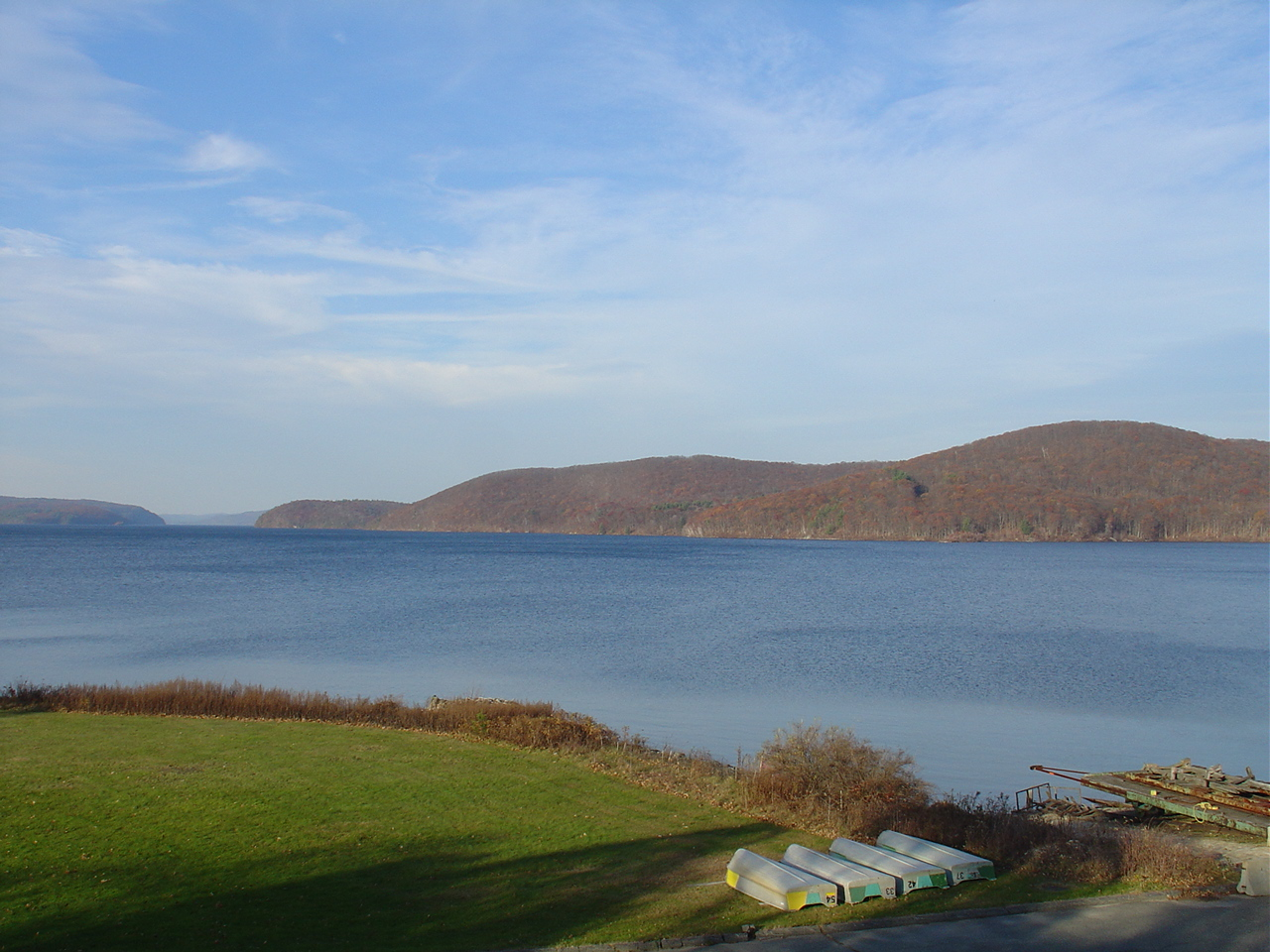
Quabbin Reservoir

Water supply and sewage-disposal services are provided by the Boston Water and Sewer Commission. The Commission in turn purchases wholesale water and sewage disposal from the Massachusetts Water Resources Authority. The city's water comes from the Quabbin Reservoir and the Wachusett Reservoir, which are about 65 miles (105 km) and 35 miles (56 km) west of the city respectively. Boston is one of five cities in the country with tap water pure enough to be exempt from Environmental Protection Agency filtration requirements.
