= EOP =

EOP may refer to:

== Government and military ==
- Emergency operations plan, in emergency planning
- Enhanced opportunity partner, a NATO-interoperable state
- Executive Office of the President of the United States

== Science ==
- Earth orientation parameters, in geodesy
- Endogenous opioid peptide, in biochemistry
- External occipital protuberance, of the skull

== Technology ==
- Electroosmotic pump, in microfluidics
- Escalation of privilege, in cybersecurity
- Ethernet over PDH, in networking
- Exchange Online Protection, a Microsoft email security service

== Other uses ==
- Early Oil Project, the development of the Chirag oilfield
- Hellenic Cycling Federation (Greek: Ελληνικη Ομοσπονδια Ποδηλασιας), the governing body of cycle racing in Greece
- European Opera-directing Prize
