= MXP =

MXP may refer to:

== Computing and telecommunications ==
- MXP (computing), a protocol in online gaming
- Metropolitan Exchange Point, a major point-to-point location in computer networking, including:
  - Boston MXP

== Other uses ==
- MXP: Most Xtreme Primate, a 2003 Canadian film
- MxPx, American punk rock band
- Milan Malpensa Airport, in Milan, Italy (IATA code)
- Methoxphenidine, a dissociative drug
- Mexican peso, before 1993 (obsolete ISO 4217 code)
- Tlahuitoltepec Mixe, a language spoken in Mexico (ISO 639-3 code)
