= Columbitech =

Cybersecurity company in Sweden

- Company type: Private
- Industry: Mobile Communication
- Founded: 2000
- Headquarters: Stockholm, Sweden
- Products: Columbitech Mobile VPN

Columbitech, founded in 2000, provides wireless security to secure mobile devices, with support for WLAN and public networks, including 3G, 4G and WiMAX. The company is headquartered in Stockholm, Sweden with offices in New York City.

== Columbitech Mobile VPN ==
The Columbitech mobile VPN provides remote network access to field mobility users, corporate WLAN users and remote workers – mobilizing the enterprise. The service is encrypted on standards-based Wireless Transport Layer Security (WTLS) and holds a FIPS 140-2 certification.

The technology is utilized in the retail industry to meet PCI DSS requirements, and in other industries where mobile devices are used over wireless networks.
