= Ethernet over SDH =

Ethernet Over SDH (EoS or EoSDH) or Ethernet over SONET refers to a set of protocols which allow Ethernet traffic to be carried over synchronous digital hierarchy networks in an efficient and flexible way. The same functions are available using SONET.

Ethernet frames which are to be sent on the SDH link are sent through an "encapsulation" block (typically Generic Framing Procedure or GFP) to create a synchronous stream of data from the asynchronous Ethernet packets. The synchronous stream of encapsulated data is then passed through a mapping block which typically uses virtual concatenation (VCAT) to route the stream of bits over one or more SDH paths. As this is byte interleaved, it provides a better level of security compared to other mechanisms for Ethernet transport.

After traversing SDH paths, the traffic is processed in the reverse fashion: virtual concatenation path processing to recreate the original synchronous byte stream, followed by decapsulation to converting the synchronous data stream to an asynchronous stream of Ethernet frames.

The SDH paths may be VC-4, VC-3, VC-12 or VC-11 paths. Up to 64 VC-11 or VC-12 paths can be concatenated together to form a single larger virtually concatenated group. Up to 256 VC-3 or VC-4 paths can be concatenated together to form a single larger virtually concatenated group. The paths within a group are referred to as "members". A virtually concatenated group is typically referred to by the notation pathType-Xv, where pathType is VC-4, VC-3, VC-12 or VC-11 and X is the number of members in the group.

- A 10-Mbit/s Ethernet link is often transported over a VC-12-5v which allows the full bandwidth to be carried for all packet sizes.
- A 100-Mbit/s Ethernet link is often transported over a VC-3-2v which allows the full bandwidth to be carried when smaller packets are used (< 250 bytes) and Ethernet flow control restricts the rate of traffic for larger packets. But does only give ca. 97 Mbit/s, not full 100 Mb.
- A 1000-Mbit/s (or 1 GigE) Ethernet link is often transported over a VC-3-21v or a VC-4-7v which allows the full bandwidth to be carried for all packets.

Possible bandwidths
Container (SDH)	Container (SONET)	Type	Payload Capacity (Mbit/s)
VC-11-Xv	VT-1.5-Xv SPE	Low Order	X x 1.600 (X = 1 to 64)
VC-12-Xv	VT-2-Xv SPE	Low Order	X x 2.176 (X = 1 to 64)
VC-2-Xv	-	Low Order	X x 6.848 (X = 1 to 64)
VC-3-Xv	STS-1-Xv SPE	High Order	X x 48.384 (X = 1 to 256)
VC-4-Xv	STS-3c-Xv SPE	High Order	X x 149.76 (X = 1 to 256)

EoS also drops the "idle" packets of the Ethernet frame before encapsulating the Ethernet frame to GFP, which is recreated at the other end during decapsulation process. Hence this provide a better throughput compared to native Ethernet transport.

An additional protocol, called link capacity adjustment scheme (LCAS), allows the two endpoints of the SDH paths to negotiate which paths are working and can carry traffic versus which paths should not be used to carry traffic.

== See also ==
- Packet over SONET
