= Inverse Multiplexing for ATM =

Inverse Multiplexing for ATM (IMA) is a standardized technology used to transport ATM traffic over a bundle of T1 or E1 lines, which is called an IMA Group. This allows for gradual increase in data link capacity where implementing a higher capacity solution like T3/E3 or SONET/SDH is not deemed feasible. The maximum number of lines in an IMA Group is 32, bringing the total data rate to roughly 64 Mbit/s. The standard specification was initially approved by The ATM Forum in July 1997, and was later updated to version 1.1 in March 1999.

ATM cell insertion happens in the round robin fashion and is transparent for the terminal equipment on the ends of the link. IMA inverse multiplexing functionality requires some overhead (ICP or IMA Control Protocol cells, typically one ICP cell in every IMA frame—commonly 128 cells in length—and in CTC or Common Transmit Clock mode, an ICP stuff cell must be inserted after every 2048 cells), and an IMA sublayer on the physical layer.

== See also ==
- Inverse multiplexing
