= Metropolitan area network =

Computer network serving a populated area

A metropolitan area network (MAN) is a computer network that interconnects users with computer resources in a geographic region of the size of a metropolitan area. The term MAN is applied to the interconnection of local area networks (LANs) in a city into a single larger network which may then also offer efficient connection to a wide area network. The term is also used to describe the interconnection of several LANs in a metropolitan area through the use of point-to-point connections between them.

== History ==
By 1999, local area networks (LANs) were well established and providing data communication in buildings and offices. For the interconnection of LANs within a city, businesses relied primarily on the public switched telephone network. But while the telephone network was able to support the packet-based exchange of data that the various LAN protocols implemented, the bandwidth of the telephone network was already under heavy demand from circuit-switched voice, and the telephone exchanges were ill-designed to cope with the traffic spikes that LANs tended to produce.

To interconnect local area networks more effectively, it was suggested that office buildings are connected using the single-mode optical fiber lines, which were by that time widely used in long-haul telephone trunks. Such dark fibre links were in some cases already installed on customer premises and telephone companies started to offer their dark fibre within their subscriber packages. Fibre optic metropolitan area networks were operated by telephone companies as private networks for their customers and did not necessarily have full integration with the public wide area network (WAN) through gateways.

Besides the larger companies that connected their offices across metropolitan areas, universities and research institutions also adopted dark fibre as their metropolitan area network backbone. In West Berlin the BERCOM project built up a multifunctional broadband communications system to connect the mainframe computers that publicly funded universities and research institutions in the city housed. The BERCOM MAN project could progress at speed because the Deutsche Bundespost had already installed hundreds of miles of fibre optic cable in West Berlin. Like other metropolitan dark fibre networks at the time, the dark fibre network in West Berlin had a star topology with a hub somewhere in the city centre. The backbone of the dedicated BERCOM MAN for universities and research institutions was an optical fibre double ring that used a high-speed slotted ring protocol developed by the GMD Research Centre for Innovative Computer Systems and Telephony. The BERCOM MAN backbone could thus support two times 280 Mbit/s data transfer.

Wavelength division multiplexing operating principle

The productive use of dense wavelength-division multiplexing (DWDM) provided another impetus for the development of metropolitan area networks in the 2000s. Long haul DWDM, with ranges from 0 to 3000+ km, had been developed so that companies that stored large amounts of data on different sites could exchange data or establish mirrors of their file server. With the use of DWDM on the existing fibre optic MANs of carriers, companies no longer needed to connect their LANs with a dedicated fibre optic link. With DWDM companies could build dedicated MANs using the existing dark fibre network of a provider in a city. MANs thus became cheaper to build and maintain. The DWDM platforms provided by dark fibre providers in cities allow for a single fibre pair to be divided into 32 wavelengths. One wavelength could support between 10 Mbit/s and 10 Gbit/s. Thus companies that paid for a MAN to connect different office sites within a city could increase the bandwidths of their MAN backbone as part of their subscription. DWDM platforms also alleviated the need for protocol conversion to connect LANs in a city, because any protocol and any traffic type could be transmitted using DWDM. Effectively, it gave companies wishing to establish a MAN a choice of protocol.

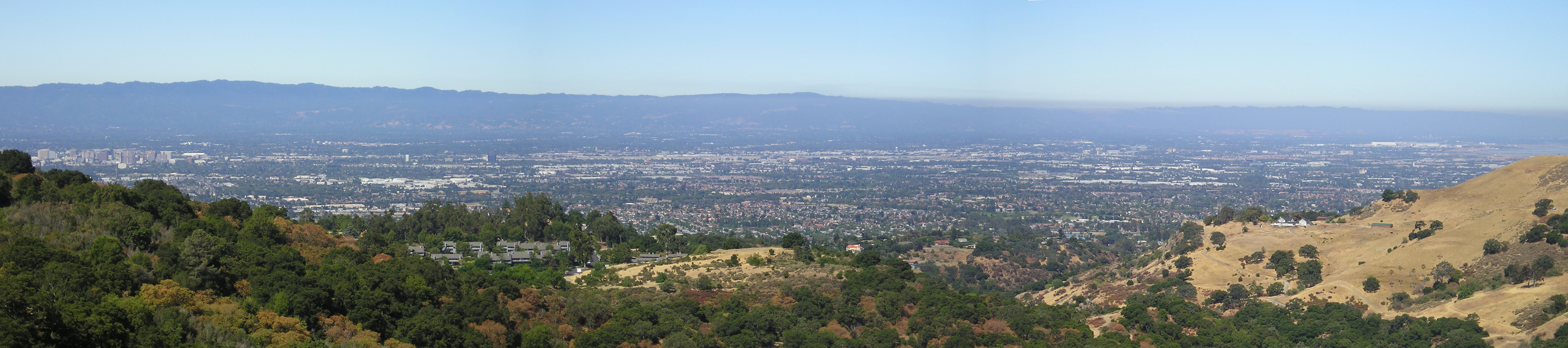
Looking west over northern San Jose and other parts of Silicon Valley technology hub. Between 2002 and 2003 the Sprint Corporation built five Metro Ethernet rings to connect the metropolitan areas.

Metro Ethernet uses a fibre optic ring as a Gigabit Ethernet MAN backbone within a larger city. The ring topology is implemented using Internet Protocol (IP) so that data can be rerouted if a link is congested or fails. In the US the Sprint was an early adopter of fibre optic rings that routed IP packets on the MAN backbone. Between 2002 and 2003 Sprint built three MAN rings to cover San Francisco, Oakland and San Jose, and in turn connected these three metro rings with a further two rings. The Sprint metro rings routed voice and data, were connected to several local telecom exchange points and totalled 189 miles of fibre optic cable. The metro rings also connected many cities that went on to become part of the Silicon Valley tech-hub, such as Fremont, Milpitas, Mountain View, Palo Alto, Redwood City, San Bruno, San Carlos, Santa Clara and Sunnyvale.

The metro Ethernet rings that did not route IP traffic instead used one of the various proprietary Spanning Tree Protocol implementations; each MAN ring had a root bridge. Because layer 2 switching can not operate if there is a loop in the network, the protocols to support L2 MAN rings all need to block redundant links and thus block part of the ring. Capsuling protocols, such as Multiprotocol Label Switching (MPLS), were also deployed to address the drawbacks of operating L2 metro Ethernet rings.

Metro Ethernet was effectively the extension of Ethernet protocols beyond the local area network (LAN) and the ensuing investment in Ethernet led to the deployment of carrier Ethernet, where Ethernet protocols are used in wide area networks (WANs). The efforts of the Metro Ethernet Forum (MEF) in defining best practice and standards for metropolitan area networks thus also defined carrier Ethernet. While the IEEE tried to standardise the emerging Ethernet-based proprietary protocols, industry forums such as the MEF filled the gap and in January 2013 launched a certification for network equipment that can be configured to meet Carrier Ethernet 2.0 specifications.

== Metropolitan Internet exchange points ==
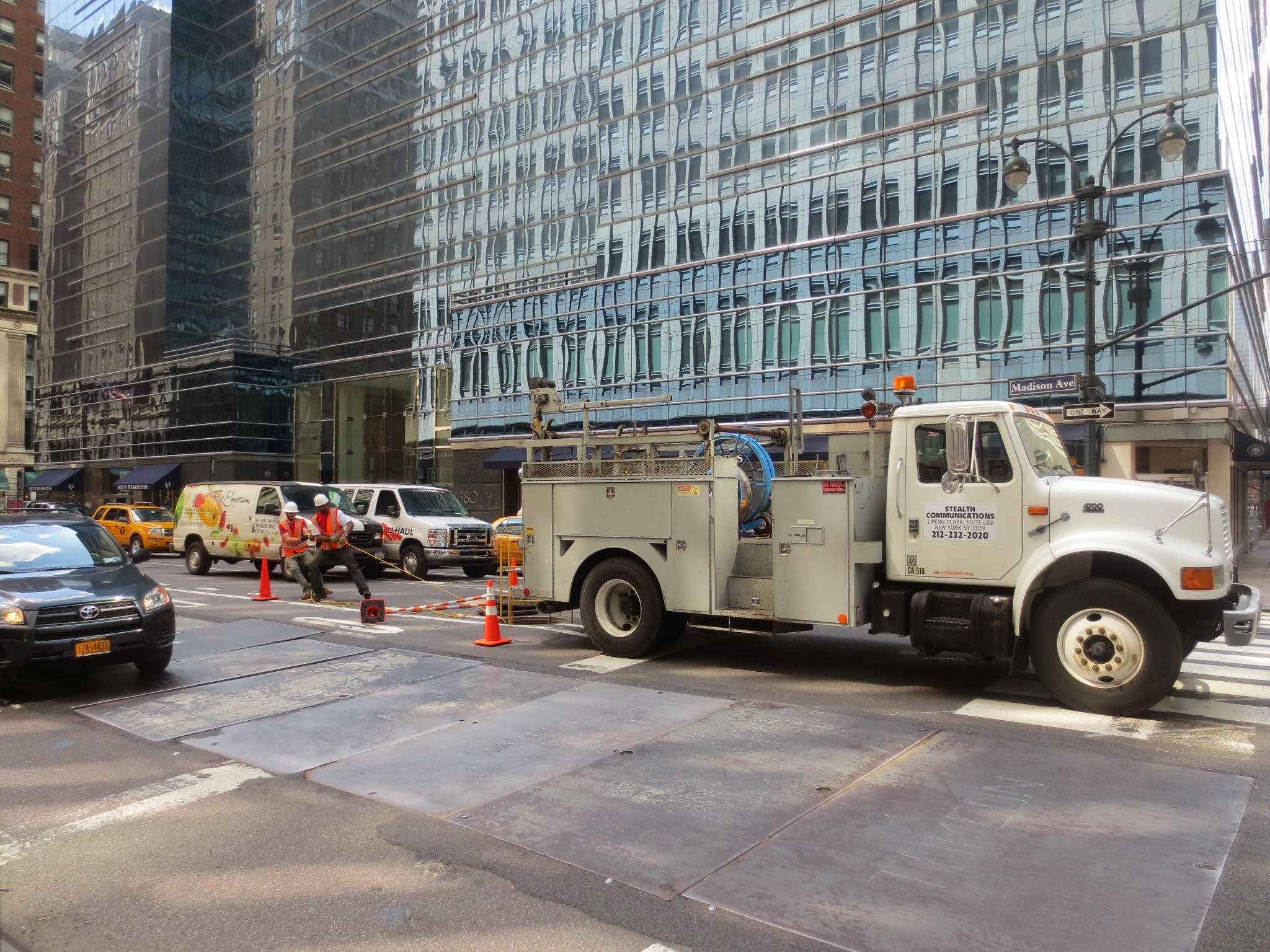
Stealth Fiber Crew installing a 432-count dark fibre cable underneath the streets of New York City.

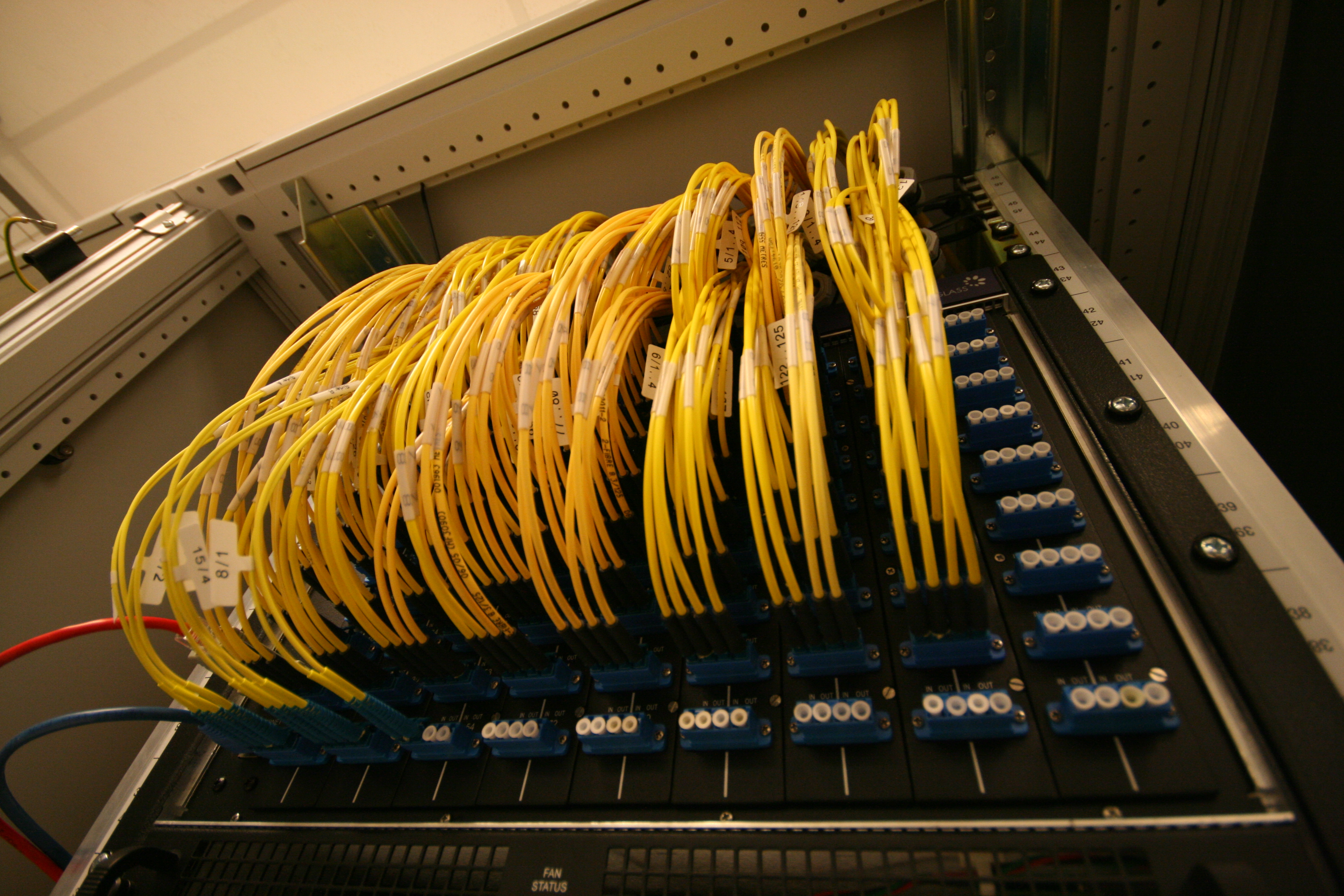
An optical fiber photonic switch at the AMS-IX

Internet exchange points (IXs) have historically been important for the connection of MANs to the national or global Internet. The Boston Metropolitan Exchange Point (Boston MXP) enabled metro Ethernet providers, such as the HarvardNet to exchange data with national carriers, such as the Sprint Corporation and AT&T. Exchange points also serve as low-latency links between campus area networks, thus the Massachusetts Institute of Technology and Boston University could exchange data, voice and video using the Boston MXP. Further examples of metropolitan Internet exchanges in the USA that were operational as of 2002 include the Anchorage Metropolitan Access Point (AMAP), the Seattle Internet Exchange (SIX), the Dallas-Fort Worth Metropolitan Access Point (DFMAP) and the Denver Internet Exchange (IX-Denver). Verizon put into operation three regional metropolitan exchanges to interconnect MANs and give them access to the Internet. The MAE-West serves the MANs of San Jose, Los Angeles and California. The MAE-East interconnects the MANs of New York City, Washington, D.C., and Miami. While the MAE-Central interconnects the MANs of Dallas, Texas, and Illinois.

In larger cities several local providers may have built a dark fibre MAN backbone. In London, the metro Ethernet rings of several providers make up the London MAN infrastructure. Like other MANs, the London MAN primarily serves the needs of its urban customers, who typically need a high number of connections with low bandwidth, a fast transit to other MAN providers, as well as high bandwidth access to national and international long-haul providers. Within the MAN of larger cities, metropolitan exchange points now play a vital role. The London Internet Exchange (LINX) had by 2005 built up several exchange points across the Greater London region.

Cities that host one of the international Internet exchanges have become a preferred location for companies and data centres. The Amsterdam Internet Exchange (AMS-IX) is the world's second-largest Internet exchange and has attracted companies to Amsterdam that are dependent on high-speed internet access. The Amsterdam metropolitan area network has benefited too from high-speed Internet access. Similarly Frankfurt has become a magnet for data centres of international companies because it hosts the non-profit DE-CIX, the largest Internet exchange in the world. The business model of the metro DE-CIX is to reduce the transit cost for local carriers by keeping data in the metropolitan area or region, while at the same time allowing long-haul low-latency peering globally with other major MANs.

== See also ==
- Community network
- E-government
- Municipal wireless network
- Smart city
- Wireless community network
