= Inverse multiplexer =

Breaks a data stream into multiple lower data rate streams

A high data rate signal is inverse multiplexed over multiple slower links, then recombined

An inverse multiplexer (often abbreviated to inverse MUX or IMUX) allows a data stream to be broken into multiple lower data rate communication links. An inverse multiplexer differs from a demultiplexer because the multiple output streams from the former stay inter-related, whereas those from the latter are unrelated. An inverse multiplexer is the opposite of a multiplexer in that it divides one high-speed link into multiple low-speed links, whereas a multiplexer combines multiple low-speed links into one high-speed link.

This provides an end to end connection of several times the data rate available on each of the low rate data links. Note that, as with multiplexers, links are often used in bi-directional pairs and, at either end of the link, an inverse multiplexer will be combined with its reverse (an inverse demultiplexer) and still be called an inverse MUX.

Inverse multiplexers are used, for example, to combine a number of ISDN channels together into one high rate circuit, where a higher rate connection than is available from a single ISDN connection is needed. This is typically useful in areas where higher rate circuits are not available.

An alternative to an inverse multiplexer is to use separate links and load sharing of data between them. In the case of IP, network packets could be sent in round-robin mode between each separate link. Advantages of using inverse multiplexing over separate links include:

- Lower link latency (one single packet can be spread across all links)
- Fairer load balancing
- Network simplicity (no network switch needed between boxes with high-speed interfaces)

A simple analogy to transport can help explain the distinction between multiplexing and inverse multiplexing. When small cargoes such as pencils are shipped overseas, they are generally not carried one at a time, but are assembled into small boxes, which are grouped into larger cartons, which go into intermodal containers, which are packed onto a container ship. Each step is analogous to a multiplexing process. Conversely a large cargo, for example in structure relocation, may be disassembled for carriage on multiple vehicles and reassembled at the destination. This is analogous to inverse multiplexing.

== See also ==
- Bonding protocol
- Divide-and-conquer algorithm
- Inverse Multiplexing for ATM
- Link aggregation
- Multiplexer
- Multilink PPP
- Virtual concatenation
