= Mobile virtual private network =

A mobile virtual private network (mobile VPN or mVPN) is a VPN which is capable of persisting during sessions across changes in physical connectivity, point of network attachment, and IP address. The "mobile" in the name refers to the fact that the VPN can change points of network attachment, not necessarily that the mVPN client is a mobile phone or that it is running on a wireless network.

Mobile VPNs are used in environments where workers need to keep application sessions open at all times, throughout the working day, as they connect via various wireless networks, encounter gaps in coverage, or suspend-and-resume their devices to preserve battery life. A conventional VPN cannot survive such events because the network tunnel is disrupted, causing applications to disconnect, time out, fail, or even the computing device itself to crash. Mobile VPNs are commonly used in public safety, home care, hospital settings, field service management, utilities and other industries. Increasingly, they are being adopted by mobile professionals and white-collar workers.

== Comparison with other VPN types ==
A VPN maintains an authenticated, encrypted tunnel for securely passing data traffic over public networks (typically, the Internet.) Other VPN types are IPsec VPNs, which are useful for point-to-point connections when the network endpoints are known and remain fixed; or SSL VPNs, which provide for access through a Web browser and are commonly used by remote workers.

Makers of mobile VPNs draw a distinction between remote access and mobile environments. A remote-access user typically establishes a connection from a fixed endpoint, launches applications that connect to corporate resources as needed, and then logs off. In a mobile environment, the endpoint changes constantly (for instance, as users roam between different cellular networks or Wi-Fi access points). A mobile VPN maintains a virtual connection to the application at all times as the endpoint changes, handling the necessary network logins in a manner transparent to the user.

== Functions ==
The following are functions common to mobile VPNs.

Function	Description
Persistence	Open applications remain active, open and available when the wireless connection changes or is interrupted, a laptop goes into hibernation, or a handheld user suspends and resumes the device
Roaming	Underlying virtual connection remains intact when the device switches to a different network; the mobile VPN handles the logins automatically
Application compatibility	Software applications that run in an "always-connected" wired LAN environment run over the mobile VPN without modification
Security	Enforces authentication of the user, the device, or both; as well as encryption of the data traffic in compliance with security standards such as FIPS 140-2
Acceleration	Link optimization and data compression improve performance over wireless networks, especially on cellular networks where bandwidth may be constrained.
Strong authentication	Enforces two-factor authentication or multi-factor authentication using some combination of a password, smart card, public key certificate or biometric device; required by some regulations, notably for access to CJIS systems in law enforcement

== Management ==
Some mobile VPNs offer additional "mobile-aware" management and security functions, giving information technology departments visibility and control over devices that may not be on the corporate premises or that connect through networks outside IT's direct control.

Function	Description
Management console	Displays status of devices and users, and offers the ability to quarantine a device if there is possibility that it may have been lost or stolen
Policy Management	Enforces access policies based on the network in use, bandwidth of the connection, on layer-3 and layer-4 attributes (IP address, TCP and UDP port, etc.), time of day, and in some VPNs, the ability to control access by individual application software
Quality of service	Specifies the priority that different applications or services should receive when contending for available wireless bandwidth; this is useful for ensuring delivery of the essential "mission-critical" applications (such as computer-assisted dispatch for public safety) or giving priority to streaming media or voice-over-IP
Network access control (NAC)	Evaluates the patch status, anti-virus and anti-spyware protection status, and other aspects of the "health" of the device before allowing a connection; and optionally may integrate with policies to remediate the device automatically
Mobile Analytics	Gives administrators a view into how wireless networks and devices are used
Notifications	Alerts administrators of security concerns or connection problems that impact users, delivered via SMTP, SNMP or syslog

== Industries and applications ==
Mobile VPNs have found uses in a variety of industries, where they give mobile workers access to software applications.

Industry	Workers	Applications
Public Safety	Police officers, firefighters, emergency services personnel, first responders	Computer-aided dispatch, automatic vehicle location, state driver's license and vehicle registration plate databases, criminal databases like the FBI Criminal Justice Information System (CJIS), dashcam software, departmental intranet
Home Care	Visiting nurses, in-home physical therapists and occupational therapists, home care aides and hospice workers	Electronic health records, electronic medical records, scheduling and billing applications
Hospitals and Clinics	Physicians, nurses and other staff	Electronic health records, Electronic medical records, Picture archiving and communications systems, Computerized physician order entry, pharmacy, patient registration, scheduling, housekeeping, billing, accounting
Field Service	Field-service engineers, repair technicians	Field Service Management which can include customer relationship management, work order management, Computer-aided dispatch, and historical customer service data as well as databases of customer-premises equipment, access requirements, and parts inventory; asset tracking, parts ordering, documentation access
Field Sales	Sales representatives	Customer relationship management, inventory, order fulfillment
Utilities	Linemen, installation and repair technicians, field-service engineers	Computer-aided dispatch, scheduling, work-order management, geographic information systems, maintenance tracking, parts ordering, customer-service, testing and training applications
Insurance	Claims adjusters	Claims systems, estimating applications

== In telecommunications ==
In telecommunication, a mobile VPN is a solution that provides data user mobility and ensures secure network access with predictable performance. Data user mobility is defined as uninterrupted connectivity or the ability to stay connected and communicate to a possibly remote data network while changing the network access medium or points of attachment.

In 2001, Huawei launched a product named "MVPN". In this case "MVPN" had a different meaning from the way that later industry sources would use the term. The Huawei product was focused on delivering a seamless corporate phone system to users whether they were on desktop phones or mobile devices. Although the web page is no longer available, the company advertised that their MVPN had the following advantages over a standard phone system:

- Direct connectivity – the corporate network becomes part of mobile operator's network through direct connection
- Private numbering plan – the communication is tailored to company organization
- Corporate Business Group – all offices and employees are part of one common group, that includes all mobile and desk phones
- Short dialing – a short number to access each employee, no meter on his mobile or desk phone
- Smart Divert – easy divert within company group
- Groups and subgroups – Several sub-groups could be defined within the group with different changing as well as with separate numbering plan
- Calls control – certain destinations could be allowed or barred both on mobile and desk phones.

== Vendors ==
- Bittium
- Columbitech
- Connectify
- Ericsson
- NeoAccel
- NetMotion Wireless
- Radio IP Software
- Smith Micro Software
- Tmharay
