= Radio IP Software =

- Company type: Private
- Industry: Computer software
- Founded: 1998
- Founder: Yvon Bergeron
- Headquarters: Montreal, Canada
- Key people: Yvon Bergeron, Founder & Chairman
- Products: Radio IP MTG, ipUnplugged, GPS Director, GPS Partner, Radio IP Shadoport, Radio IP Mobility Manager
- Services: Installation and Maintenance & Support
- Website: www.radio-ip.com

Radio IP Software is a privately held software company specializing in mobile data connectivity and mobile virtual private network (Mobile VPN) solutions. Established in 1998, Radio IP Software is headquartered in Montreal, Quebec, Canada and has offices in Florida, USA and London, England.

In 2009, Radio IP Software completed the acquisition of ipUnplugged AB, a Stockholm, Sweden based developer of the ipUnplugged Mobile VPN software, which was designed using the Mobile IP standard communications protocol and including the IPSec security standards.

== Users ==
Radio IP Software's users are primarily in the public safety, utility, mobile government, and enterprise sectors.
