= Transparent LAN Service =

Transparent LAN Service (TLS) is a service from a carrier linking together remote Ethernet networks. It is called "transparent" because the connected networks are viewed as one contiguous network by the customer, regardless of the deployed technology by the carrier in between. Its primary real world deployment is usually limited to corporations who 1) require remote office or back-end data center connectivity at close to LAN speed, and 2) do not have in-house expertise in WAN management, as TLS is usually purchased as a fully managed service (meaning the carrier chosen owns, configures, monitors, and maintains the equipment needed for the service to function). The availability of TLS service depends on the carrier's underlying network architecture. In most cases, it is only available in large metropolitan areas and office buildings, campuses, or data centers large enough to warrant the proper equipment.

Transparent LAN service between two sites has been successful, but multi-point transparent LANs have been problematic due to the difference in architecture between the broadcast-based Ethernet and the carrier's point-to-point network. The VPLS (a type of VPN) standard was developed to resolve the problem using IP and MPLS routers.
