= Boston Internet Exchange =

- Full name: Boston Internet Exchange
- Abbreviation: Boston IX
- Founded: 2012
- Location: United States, Boston, Massachusetts, US
- Website: www.bostonix.net
- Members: 48
- Ports: Layer 2 Ethernet
- Peers: Major content; Delivery networks; Carriers; Cloud providers
- Peak: 321 Gigabits
- Peak in: 300 Gigabits
- Peak out: ▲321 Gbps
- Daily (avg.): Twice daily
- Daily in (avg.): 06:00; 18:00

The Boston Internet Exchange is an Internet exchange point in Boston, Massachusetts, USA. The Boston IX is owned and operated by Markley Group, hosted in Markley's One Summer Street, Boston datacenter and their Prince Avenue, Lowell datacenter.

The domain bostonix.net was registered by Patrick Gilmore in 2010 and was donated to the exchange. In 2012 the Boston IX went online with the Free Software Foundation as its first participant.

The exchange point supports IPv4 and IPv6 unicast peering, as well as private virtual network interconnects.

Some consider the Boston IX to be the successor of the now defunct Boston MXP started by MAI.net and Vincent Bono. Initially in 2007, Barton Bruce from Global NAPs and TowardEX Technologies had planned to replace the aging Boston MXP due to Global NAPs closing down its business.

== See also ==
- Internet Exchange Point
- List of Internet exchange points
