= Edimax =

EDIMAX Technology Co., Ltd.
- Native name: 訊舟科技股份有限公司
- Type: Public
- Traded as: TWSE: 3047
- Industry: Communications Equipment
- Founded: 1986
- Headquarters: Neihu, Taipei, Taiwan
- Area served: global
- Products: networking products
- Number of employees: 1001-5000 (2023)
- Website: http://www.edimax.com/edimax/global/

Edimax Technology Co., Ltd. (Chinese: 訊舟科技股份有限公司) is a Taiwanese networking hardware manufacturer. It also operates in the telephone and telegraph apparatus sector. Founded in 1986 and headquartered in Taipei, Edimax serves both home users and small-to-medium businesses (SMBs) worldwide. The company has been publicly traded on the Taiwan Stock Exchange since 2001.

== History ==
Edimax Technology was founded in June 1986 in Taipei, Taiwan, originally under the name Edimax International Co., Ltd. The company initially focused on manufacturing and selling computer peripherals, interface cards, controllers, and keyboards.By the mid-1990s, Edimax had transitioned to focus on networking technology and added research and development functions to support this sector. In 1995, the company adopted its current name, Edimax Technology Co., Ltd., and began marketing products under its own Edimax brand. In the late 1990s and 2000s, Edimax expanded internationally by establishing branch offices and subsidiaries across North America, Europe, and Asia.

== Products ==
Edimax designs and manufactures a broad range of networking solutions for both consumers and enterprises. Its product portfolio includes wireless routers, range extenders, network switches, access points, wireless adapters, powerline adapters, IP cameras, and IoT devices. The company also offers specialized solutions such as surveillance networking, smart home devices, air quality monitors, and AIoT/IIoT connectivity products for industrial and business applications. Since 2000, approximately 50 Edimax products have received the Taiwan Excellence Award, recognizing excellence in R&D, design, quality, and innovation.

== See also ==
- List of companies of Taiwan
