= Connectify =

American networking software company

- Type: Private
- Industry: Computer software
- Founded: 1 October 2009
- Founder: Alex Gizis
- Headquarters: Philadelphia, Pennsylvania, United States
- Area served: Worldwide
- Key people: Alex Gizis (CEO); Bhana Grover (President); Brian Prodoehl (CTO); Scott Ackerman (Creative Director)
- Products: Connectify Hotspot, Speedify
- Brands: Connectify Hotspot, Speedify
- Website: www.connectify.com

Connectify (/kəˈnɛktɪfaɪ/) is an American software company that develops networking software for consumers, professionals and companies. Connectify Hotspot is a virtual router and Wi-Fi repeater software for Microsoft Windows. Speedify is a mobile VPN bonding service and app with channel bonding capabilities, that helps combine Wi-Fi, 4G, 5G, Ethernet, Starlink and Satellite connections at the same time. Powered by Speedify delivers embedded solutions for routers, networking appliances, and smart devices.

== History ==
Connectify launched their first product, Connectify Hotspot, in October 2009. It can enable a Windows PC to serve as a router over Ethernet or Wi-Fi. Along with a Windows 10 or higher certified Wi-Fi device it can act as a wireless access point. This enables users to share files, printers, and Internet connections between multiple computing devices without the need for a separate physical access point or router.

Connectify spent the next two years improving the product, first making it free and ad-supported. In 2011, Connectify switched to a freemium commercial model which included premium features for paying customers. These features included extended support of 3G/4G mobile devices, fully customizable SSIDs and premium customer support.

In 2011, Connectify received funding from In-Q-Tel to begin developing a more powerful and secure remote networking platform and a connection-aggregation application. Connectify used this funding to develop the foundation of the application, and then in 2012 turned to the crowdfunding site Kickstarter to raise additional funding to develop Connectify Dispatch. Dispatch was a load balancer which could combine any number of Ethernet, Wi-Fi or mobile Internet connections.

In 2014, Connectify launched Speedify, a channel bonding application for PCs running Microsoft Windows and macOS. In January 2016, Speedify for Mobile was launched at CES, adding support for iOS and Android. In December 2016, Speedify added encryption on all supported platforms, turning it into a mobile virtual private network.

Connectify released other apps: Pingify (in 2017) - a mobile network diagnostics tool, and EdgeWise Connect (in 2019), which were eventually discontinued.

== Products ==
=== Speedify ===
Speedify is a software-based channel bonding service available app for devices running Windows, macOS, Linux, Android, iOS, iPadOS and routers running OpenWrt. Speedify can combine multiple Internet connections given its link aggregation capabilities. In theory, this should offer faster Internet connection speeds and failover protection.

Speedify 1.0 was launched in June 2014 as a channel bonding service. Starting 2016, as a VPN service, Speedify's privacy policy states they do not log what users do or what sites they visit through the Speedify service.

Starting with version 10, in 2020, Speedify provides QoS for live streams with its new streaming mode, which dynamically prioritizes streaming traffic.

Speedify's version 14, launched in 2023, introduced Pair & Share. This allows sharing cellular connections back and forth between multiple Speedify users on the same local network wirelessly.

The Speedify app can be used for free for the first 2 GB each month; there are monthly and yearly subscription plans available, as well as access to dedicated VPN servers.

Tom's Guide picked Speedify as the fastest VPN in late 2018. Speedify became Citrix Ready in late 2019.

=== Speedify for enterprise ===
Speedify's solutions for companies include:

- Speedify Teams is a multi-seat Speedify mobile VPN subscription with added centralized account management capabilities.
- Speedify SDK allows developers to build the Speedify functionality into their own apps on Windows, macOS, Linux, iOS and Android.
- Powered by Speedify allows vendors to embed Speedify into their networking devices. As of October 2024, Miri Technologies and Magewell released the Miri X510 bonding router.

=== Connectify Hotspot ===
Connectify Hotspot is a virtual router software application available for PCs running Windows 10 or a later version. It was launched in 2009 by Connectify and its latest available version is Connectify Hotspot 27. It has 3 main functions:

- Wi-Fi hotspot - users can share the Internet connection from their PC through a Wi-Fi adapter. The free version, Hotspot Lite, allows sharing of wired or Wi-Fi Internet, USB-tethered phones and VPN connections via Wi-Fi, in timed sessions. The paid versions allow users to share any type of Internet connection, including 4G / LTE. through Wi-Fi or Ethernet and remove the limited hotspot uptime.
- Wired router - users can share a computer's Wi-Fi connection via Ethernet. This functionality is only available in the paid versions of Connectify Hotspot.
- Wi-Fi repeater - users can extend the range of a Wi-Fi network and bridge other devices on that network directly. This functionality is only available in the paid versions of Connectify Hotspot.

Connectify Hotspot also incorporates a universal ad blocker for clients connecting to the Wi-Fi or Ethernet network it creates. This feature is available for free.

== Discontinued apps ==
Pingify was a free utility for testing network coverage, Internet reliability and VPN dependability. It was available for iOS devices, helping you run ping on your iPhone. Pingify was developed as an internal testing tool for Speedify on iOS - a mobile network diagnostics tool. Then, in 2017, it was made publicly available.

EdgeWise Connect was a simple VPN available for iPhone and Android which could seamlessly move web traffic between the Wi-Fi and cellular data connections. The service used channel bonding technology and was fully encrypted. EdgeWise Connect was launched in early 2019 and could be used for free for a few hours each day; there were monthly and yearly subscription plans available.
