= Boston MXP =

Boston Metropolitan Exchange Point
- Abbreviation: MXP
- Founded: 1996
- Location: Boston, Massachusetts, United States
- Website: www.bmxp.net
- Peers: 8 As of August 2009
- Peak: 40 Mbit/s As of August 2009
- Daily (avg.): 40 Mbit/s As of August 2009

The Boston MXP was an Internet Exchange Point in Boston, Massachusetts and Quincy, Massachusetts. It was founded by MAI in 1996. It supports 10 megabit and 100 megabit connections on copper, and gigabit connections on fiber. Global NAPs, the main sponsor of the Boston MXP, was sold on February 29, 2012. The Boston MXP is no longer operational and was replaced by the Boston Internet Exchange.

== See also ==
- Internet Exchange Point
