= Generic Framing Procedure =

Generic Framing Procedure (GFP) is a multiplexing technique defined by ITU-T G.7041. This allows mapping of variable length, higher-layer client signals over a circuit switched transport network like OTN, SDH/SONET or PDH. The client signals can be protocol data unit (PDU) oriented (like IP/PPP or Ethernet media access control) or can be block-code oriented (like Fibre Channel).

There are two modes of GFP: Generic Framing Procedure - Framed (GFP-F) and Generic Framing Procedure - Transparent (GFP-T):

- GFP-F maps each client frame into a single GFP frame. GFP-F is used where the client signal is framed or packetized by the client protocol.
- GFP-T, on the other hand, allows the mapping of multiple 8B/10B block-coded client data streams into an efficient 64B/65B block code for transport within a GFP frame.

GFP utilizes a length/HEC-based frame delineation mechanism that is more robust than that used by High-Level Data Link Control (HDLC), which is single octet flag-based.

There are two types of GFP frames: a GFP client frame and a GFP control frame. A GFP client frame can be further classified as either a client data frame or a client management frame. The former is used to transport client data, while the latter is used to transport point-to-point management information like loss of signal, etc. Client management frames can be differentiated from the client data frames based on the payload type indicator. The GFP control frame currently consists only of a core header field with no payload area. This frame is used to compensate for the gaps between the client signal where the transport medium has a higher capacity than the client signal, and is better known as an idle frame.

== Frame format ==
A GFP frame consists of:

- a core header.
- a payload header
- an optional extension header
- a GFP payload
- an optional payload frame check sequence (FCS).

== Modes ==
- Framed GFP (GFP-F) is optimized for bandwidth efficiency at the expense of latency. It encapsulates complete Ethernet (or other types of) frames with a GFP header.
- Transparent GFP (GFP-T) is used for low latency transport of block-coded client signals such as Gigabit Ethernet, Fibre Channel, ESCON, FiCON, and Digital Video Broadcast (DVB). In this mode, small groups of 8B/10B symbols are transmitted rather than waiting for a complete frame of data.

== See also ==
- Virtual concatenation
- Link Capacity Adjustment Scheme
