= Multilink striping =

Example of multilink striping

Multilink striping is a type of data striping used in telecommunications to achieve higher throughput or increase the resilience of a network connection by data aggregation over multiple network links simultaneously.

Multipath routing and multilink striping are often used synonymously. However, there are some differences. When applied to end-hosts, multilink striping requires multiple physical interfaces and access to multiple networks at once. On the other hand, multiple routing paths can be obtained with a single end-host interface, either within the network, or, in case of a wireless interface and multiple neighboring nodes, at the end-host itself.

== See also ==
- RFC 1990, The PPP Multilink Protocol (MP)
- Link aggregation
