= Link Capacity Adjustment Scheme =

Link Capacity Adjustment Scheme or LCAS is a method to dynamically increase or decrease the bandwidth of virtual concatenated containers. The LCAS protocol is specified in ITU-T G.7042.

It allows on-demand increase or decrease of the bandwidth of the virtual concatenated group in a hitless manner. This brings bandwidth-on-demand capability for data clients like Ethernet when mapped into TDM containers.

LCAS is also able to temporarily remove failed members from the virtual concatenation group. A failed member will automatically cause a decrease of the bandwidth and after repair the bandwidth will increase again in a hitless fashion. Together with diverse routing this provides survivability of data traffic without requiring excess protection bandwidth allocation.
